

180001–180100 

|-bgcolor=#E9E9E9
| 180001 || 2002 YZ || — || December 27, 2002 || Anderson Mesa || LONEOS || — || align=right | 4.0 km || 
|-id=002 bgcolor=#E9E9E9
| 180002 ||  || — || December 28, 2002 || Anderson Mesa || LONEOS || — || align=right | 2.6 km || 
|-id=003 bgcolor=#E9E9E9
| 180003 ||  || — || December 27, 2002 || Anderson Mesa || LONEOS || DOR || align=right | 4.9 km || 
|-id=004 bgcolor=#E9E9E9
| 180004 ||  || — || December 31, 2002 || Socorro || LINEAR || GEF || align=right | 1.8 km || 
|-id=005 bgcolor=#E9E9E9
| 180005 ||  || — || December 31, 2002 || Socorro || LINEAR || — || align=right | 3.2 km || 
|-id=006 bgcolor=#E9E9E9
| 180006 ||  || — || December 31, 2002 || Socorro || LINEAR || — || align=right | 3.2 km || 
|-id=007 bgcolor=#E9E9E9
| 180007 ||  || — || December 31, 2002 || Socorro || LINEAR || — || align=right | 1.8 km || 
|-id=008 bgcolor=#E9E9E9
| 180008 ||  || — || December 31, 2002 || Socorro || LINEAR || — || align=right | 1.8 km || 
|-id=009 bgcolor=#E9E9E9
| 180009 ||  || — || December 31, 2002 || Socorro || LINEAR || — || align=right | 2.2 km || 
|-id=010 bgcolor=#d6d6d6
| 180010 ||  || — || December 31, 2002 || Socorro || LINEAR || EOS || align=right | 3.5 km || 
|-id=011 bgcolor=#E9E9E9
| 180011 ||  || — || December 31, 2002 || Socorro || LINEAR || — || align=right | 2.0 km || 
|-id=012 bgcolor=#E9E9E9
| 180012 ||  || — || December 31, 2002 || Socorro || LINEAR || PAD || align=right | 2.5 km || 
|-id=013 bgcolor=#E9E9E9
| 180013 ||  || — || December 31, 2002 || Socorro || LINEAR || — || align=right | 5.3 km || 
|-id=014 bgcolor=#E9E9E9
| 180014 ||  || — || December 27, 2002 || Palomar || NEAT || — || align=right | 1.5 km || 
|-id=015 bgcolor=#E9E9E9
| 180015 ||  || — || January 1, 2003 || Socorro || LINEAR || JUN || align=right | 2.0 km || 
|-id=016 bgcolor=#E9E9E9
| 180016 ||  || — || January 2, 2003 || Socorro || LINEAR || — || align=right | 3.9 km || 
|-id=017 bgcolor=#E9E9E9
| 180017 ||  || — || January 2, 2003 || Socorro || LINEAR || — || align=right | 4.7 km || 
|-id=018 bgcolor=#E9E9E9
| 180018 ||  || — || January 3, 2003 || Socorro || LINEAR || — || align=right | 4.8 km || 
|-id=019 bgcolor=#E9E9E9
| 180019 ||  || — || January 1, 2003 || Socorro || LINEAR || — || align=right | 3.5 km || 
|-id=020 bgcolor=#E9E9E9
| 180020 ||  || — || January 1, 2003 || Socorro || LINEAR || — || align=right | 3.0 km || 
|-id=021 bgcolor=#E9E9E9
| 180021 ||  || — || January 2, 2003 || Socorro || LINEAR || RAF || align=right | 2.1 km || 
|-id=022 bgcolor=#E9E9E9
| 180022 ||  || — || January 4, 2003 || Socorro || LINEAR || — || align=right | 1.6 km || 
|-id=023 bgcolor=#fefefe
| 180023 ||  || — || January 5, 2003 || Anderson Mesa || LONEOS || H || align=right | 1.4 km || 
|-id=024 bgcolor=#E9E9E9
| 180024 ||  || — || January 4, 2003 || Socorro || LINEAR || — || align=right | 3.5 km || 
|-id=025 bgcolor=#E9E9E9
| 180025 ||  || — || January 5, 2003 || Socorro || LINEAR || — || align=right | 1.9 km || 
|-id=026 bgcolor=#E9E9E9
| 180026 ||  || — || January 5, 2003 || Socorro || LINEAR || ADE || align=right | 4.4 km || 
|-id=027 bgcolor=#E9E9E9
| 180027 ||  || — || January 4, 2003 || Socorro || LINEAR || — || align=right | 3.0 km || 
|-id=028 bgcolor=#E9E9E9
| 180028 ||  || — || January 5, 2003 || Socorro || LINEAR || ADE || align=right | 3.8 km || 
|-id=029 bgcolor=#E9E9E9
| 180029 ||  || — || January 7, 2003 || Socorro || LINEAR || — || align=right | 1.6 km || 
|-id=030 bgcolor=#E9E9E9
| 180030 ||  || — || January 7, 2003 || Socorro || LINEAR || — || align=right | 3.6 km || 
|-id=031 bgcolor=#E9E9E9
| 180031 ||  || — || January 5, 2003 || Socorro || LINEAR || MRX || align=right | 1.8 km || 
|-id=032 bgcolor=#E9E9E9
| 180032 ||  || — || January 5, 2003 || Socorro || LINEAR || — || align=right | 5.6 km || 
|-id=033 bgcolor=#E9E9E9
| 180033 ||  || — || January 5, 2003 || Socorro || LINEAR || — || align=right | 2.6 km || 
|-id=034 bgcolor=#E9E9E9
| 180034 ||  || — || January 5, 2003 || Socorro || LINEAR || — || align=right | 3.8 km || 
|-id=035 bgcolor=#E9E9E9
| 180035 ||  || — || January 5, 2003 || Socorro || LINEAR || — || align=right | 4.1 km || 
|-id=036 bgcolor=#E9E9E9
| 180036 ||  || — || January 8, 2003 || Socorro || LINEAR || — || align=right | 2.2 km || 
|-id=037 bgcolor=#E9E9E9
| 180037 ||  || — || January 7, 2003 || Socorro || LINEAR || — || align=right | 2.8 km || 
|-id=038 bgcolor=#E9E9E9
| 180038 ||  || — || January 7, 2003 || Socorro || LINEAR || — || align=right | 3.0 km || 
|-id=039 bgcolor=#E9E9E9
| 180039 ||  || — || January 8, 2003 || Socorro || LINEAR || — || align=right | 3.3 km || 
|-id=040 bgcolor=#E9E9E9
| 180040 ||  || — || January 10, 2003 || Socorro || LINEAR || — || align=right | 2.6 km || 
|-id=041 bgcolor=#d6d6d6
| 180041 ||  || — || January 10, 2003 || Socorro || LINEAR || — || align=right | 4.7 km || 
|-id=042 bgcolor=#E9E9E9
| 180042 ||  || — || January 10, 2003 || Socorro || LINEAR || — || align=right | 4.7 km || 
|-id=043 bgcolor=#E9E9E9
| 180043 ||  || — || January 10, 2003 || Socorro || LINEAR || — || align=right | 3.3 km || 
|-id=044 bgcolor=#E9E9E9
| 180044 ||  || — || January 2, 2003 || Socorro || LINEAR || — || align=right | 4.3 km || 
|-id=045 bgcolor=#d6d6d6
| 180045 ||  || — || January 5, 2003 || Anderson Mesa || LONEOS || — || align=right | 4.8 km || 
|-id=046 bgcolor=#E9E9E9
| 180046 ||  || — || January 24, 2003 || La Silla || A. Boattini, H. Scholl || — || align=right | 3.4 km || 
|-id=047 bgcolor=#E9E9E9
| 180047 ||  || — || January 26, 2003 || Palomar || NEAT || — || align=right | 2.9 km || 
|-id=048 bgcolor=#E9E9E9
| 180048 ||  || — || January 26, 2003 || Palomar || NEAT || — || align=right | 3.2 km || 
|-id=049 bgcolor=#E9E9E9
| 180049 ||  || — || January 26, 2003 || Haleakala || NEAT || EUN || align=right | 2.4 km || 
|-id=050 bgcolor=#FA8072
| 180050 ||  || — || January 27, 2003 || Socorro || LINEAR || H || align=right | 1.2 km || 
|-id=051 bgcolor=#E9E9E9
| 180051 ||  || — || January 25, 2003 || Palomar || NEAT || — || align=right | 2.5 km || 
|-id=052 bgcolor=#E9E9E9
| 180052 ||  || — || January 25, 2003 || Palomar || NEAT || — || align=right | 2.9 km || 
|-id=053 bgcolor=#E9E9E9
| 180053 ||  || — || January 26, 2003 || Palomar || NEAT || — || align=right | 3.3 km || 
|-id=054 bgcolor=#E9E9E9
| 180054 ||  || — || January 27, 2003 || Socorro || LINEAR || — || align=right | 3.3 km || 
|-id=055 bgcolor=#d6d6d6
| 180055 ||  || — || January 27, 2003 || Kitt Peak || Spacewatch || — || align=right | 3.3 km || 
|-id=056 bgcolor=#E9E9E9
| 180056 ||  || — || January 27, 2003 || Socorro || LINEAR || — || align=right | 4.1 km || 
|-id=057 bgcolor=#E9E9E9
| 180057 ||  || — || January 30, 2003 || Palomar || NEAT || — || align=right | 2.4 km || 
|-id=058 bgcolor=#E9E9E9
| 180058 ||  || — || January 27, 2003 || Socorro || LINEAR || — || align=right | 3.7 km || 
|-id=059 bgcolor=#E9E9E9
| 180059 ||  || — || January 30, 2003 || Anderson Mesa || LONEOS || — || align=right | 3.0 km || 
|-id=060 bgcolor=#E9E9E9
| 180060 ||  || — || January 30, 2003 || Socorro || LINEAR || GEF || align=right | 5.3 km || 
|-id=061 bgcolor=#d6d6d6
| 180061 ||  || — || January 30, 2003 || Anderson Mesa || LONEOS || LIX || align=right | 6.9 km || 
|-id=062 bgcolor=#E9E9E9
| 180062 ||  || — || January 28, 2003 || Socorro || LINEAR || — || align=right | 4.7 km || 
|-id=063 bgcolor=#E9E9E9
| 180063 ||  || — || January 29, 2003 || Palomar || NEAT || DOR || align=right | 4.7 km || 
|-id=064 bgcolor=#E9E9E9
| 180064 ||  || — || January 31, 2003 || Socorro || LINEAR || — || align=right | 3.4 km || 
|-id=065 bgcolor=#E9E9E9
| 180065 ||  || — || January 31, 2003 || Anderson Mesa || LONEOS || — || align=right | 3.7 km || 
|-id=066 bgcolor=#d6d6d6
| 180066 ||  || — || January 31, 2003 || Anderson Mesa || LONEOS || 628 || align=right | 2.9 km || 
|-id=067 bgcolor=#E9E9E9
| 180067 ||  || — || January 30, 2003 || Anderson Mesa || LONEOS || — || align=right | 3.3 km || 
|-id=068 bgcolor=#E9E9E9
| 180068 ||  || — || January 31, 2003 || Socorro || LINEAR || RAF || align=right | 1.8 km || 
|-id=069 bgcolor=#E9E9E9
| 180069 ||  || — || January 31, 2003 || Socorro || LINEAR || WIT || align=right | 1.9 km || 
|-id=070 bgcolor=#E9E9E9
| 180070 ||  || — || January 31, 2003 || Socorro || LINEAR || — || align=right | 5.0 km || 
|-id=071 bgcolor=#d6d6d6
| 180071 ||  || — || January 26, 2003 || Anderson Mesa || LONEOS || — || align=right | 5.6 km || 
|-id=072 bgcolor=#E9E9E9
| 180072 ||  || — || February 2, 2003 || Socorro || LINEAR || — || align=right | 4.4 km || 
|-id=073 bgcolor=#E9E9E9
| 180073 ||  || — || February 2, 2003 || Socorro || LINEAR || GEF || align=right | 2.2 km || 
|-id=074 bgcolor=#E9E9E9
| 180074 ||  || — || February 1, 2003 || Socorro || LINEAR || — || align=right | 3.0 km || 
|-id=075 bgcolor=#E9E9E9
| 180075 ||  || — || February 2, 2003 || Palomar || NEAT || — || align=right | 3.7 km || 
|-id=076 bgcolor=#d6d6d6
| 180076 ||  || — || February 2, 2003 || Palomar || NEAT || — || align=right | 4.0 km || 
|-id=077 bgcolor=#E9E9E9
| 180077 ||  || — || February 3, 2003 || Goodricke-Pigott || J. W. Kessel || — || align=right | 3.3 km || 
|-id=078 bgcolor=#d6d6d6
| 180078 ||  || — || February 5, 2003 || Haleakala || NEAT || URS || align=right | 5.9 km || 
|-id=079 bgcolor=#d6d6d6
| 180079 ||  || — || February 22, 2003 || Desert Eagle || W. K. Y. Yeung || — || align=right | 4.8 km || 
|-id=080 bgcolor=#d6d6d6
| 180080 ||  || — || February 26, 2003 || Socorro || LINEAR || Tj (2.99) || align=right | 5.7 km || 
|-id=081 bgcolor=#d6d6d6
| 180081 ||  || — || February 23, 2003 || Kitt Peak || Spacewatch || — || align=right | 3.2 km || 
|-id=082 bgcolor=#E9E9E9
| 180082 ||  || — || February 25, 2003 || Campo Imperatore || CINEOS || AGN || align=right | 1.9 km || 
|-id=083 bgcolor=#d6d6d6
| 180083 ||  || — || February 22, 2003 || Palomar || NEAT || — || align=right | 4.1 km || 
|-id=084 bgcolor=#d6d6d6
| 180084 ||  || — || February 23, 2003 || Kitt Peak || Spacewatch || URS || align=right | 4.7 km || 
|-id=085 bgcolor=#d6d6d6
| 180085 ||  || — || March 3, 2003 || Palomar || NEAT || — || align=right | 5.2 km || 
|-id=086 bgcolor=#fefefe
| 180086 ||  || — || March 6, 2003 || Socorro || LINEAR || H || align=right | 1.3 km || 
|-id=087 bgcolor=#E9E9E9
| 180087 ||  || — || March 6, 2003 || Anderson Mesa || LONEOS || GEF || align=right | 2.4 km || 
|-id=088 bgcolor=#d6d6d6
| 180088 ||  || — || March 6, 2003 || Socorro || LINEAR || — || align=right | 5.1 km || 
|-id=089 bgcolor=#d6d6d6
| 180089 ||  || — || March 6, 2003 || Socorro || LINEAR || — || align=right | 3.4 km || 
|-id=090 bgcolor=#d6d6d6
| 180090 ||  || — || March 6, 2003 || Socorro || LINEAR || TIR || align=right | 4.8 km || 
|-id=091 bgcolor=#d6d6d6
| 180091 ||  || — || March 7, 2003 || Socorro || LINEAR || — || align=right | 3.0 km || 
|-id=092 bgcolor=#d6d6d6
| 180092 ||  || — || March 7, 2003 || Anderson Mesa || LONEOS || CHA || align=right | 3.5 km || 
|-id=093 bgcolor=#d6d6d6
| 180093 ||  || — || March 9, 2003 || Kitt Peak || Spacewatch || — || align=right | 3.8 km || 
|-id=094 bgcolor=#d6d6d6
| 180094 ||  || — || March 7, 2003 || Anderson Mesa || LONEOS || — || align=right | 4.1 km || 
|-id=095 bgcolor=#d6d6d6
| 180095 ||  || — || March 7, 2003 || Socorro || LINEAR || EUP || align=right | 8.0 km || 
|-id=096 bgcolor=#d6d6d6
| 180096 ||  || — || March 10, 2003 || Anderson Mesa || LONEOS || — || align=right | 4.2 km || 
|-id=097 bgcolor=#d6d6d6
| 180097 ||  || — || March 8, 2003 || Palomar || NEAT || YAK || align=right | 4.7 km || 
|-id=098 bgcolor=#d6d6d6
| 180098 ||  || — || March 6, 2003 || Goodricke-Pigott || R. A. Tucker || — || align=right | 3.8 km || 
|-id=099 bgcolor=#d6d6d6
| 180099 ||  || — || March 10, 2003 || Campo Imperatore || CINEOS || THM || align=right | 4.4 km || 
|-id=100 bgcolor=#d6d6d6
| 180100 ||  || — || March 23, 2003 || Palomar || NEAT || — || align=right | 5.8 km || 
|}

180101–180200 

|-bgcolor=#fefefe
| 180101 ||  || — || March 24, 2003 || Socorro || LINEAR || H || align=right | 1.00 km || 
|-id=102 bgcolor=#fefefe
| 180102 ||  || — || March 24, 2003 || Socorro || LINEAR || H || align=right data-sort-value="0.88" | 880 m || 
|-id=103 bgcolor=#d6d6d6
| 180103 ||  || — || March 26, 2003 || Wrightwood || J. W. Young || — || align=right | 5.9 km || 
|-id=104 bgcolor=#d6d6d6
| 180104 ||  || — || March 23, 2003 || Kitt Peak || Spacewatch || — || align=right | 3.2 km || 
|-id=105 bgcolor=#d6d6d6
| 180105 ||  || — || March 24, 2003 || Kitt Peak || Spacewatch || — || align=right | 2.8 km || 
|-id=106 bgcolor=#E9E9E9
| 180106 ||  || — || March 24, 2003 || Haleakala || NEAT || — || align=right | 4.6 km || 
|-id=107 bgcolor=#d6d6d6
| 180107 ||  || — || March 25, 2003 || Catalina || CSS || — || align=right | 4.6 km || 
|-id=108 bgcolor=#d6d6d6
| 180108 ||  || — || March 23, 2003 || Kitt Peak || Spacewatch || EOS || align=right | 3.0 km || 
|-id=109 bgcolor=#d6d6d6
| 180109 ||  || — || March 24, 2003 || Kitt Peak || Spacewatch || THM || align=right | 3.4 km || 
|-id=110 bgcolor=#d6d6d6
| 180110 ||  || — || March 24, 2003 || Kitt Peak || Spacewatch || KOR || align=right | 2.1 km || 
|-id=111 bgcolor=#d6d6d6
| 180111 ||  || — || March 24, 2003 || Kitt Peak || Spacewatch || — || align=right | 3.7 km || 
|-id=112 bgcolor=#d6d6d6
| 180112 ||  || — || March 24, 2003 || Haleakala || NEAT || — || align=right | 3.8 km || 
|-id=113 bgcolor=#d6d6d6
| 180113 ||  || — || March 23, 2003 || Kitt Peak || Spacewatch || EOS || align=right | 3.0 km || 
|-id=114 bgcolor=#d6d6d6
| 180114 ||  || — || March 23, 2003 || Kitt Peak || Spacewatch || — || align=right | 3.0 km || 
|-id=115 bgcolor=#d6d6d6
| 180115 ||  || — || March 24, 2003 || Kitt Peak || Spacewatch || — || align=right | 4.3 km || 
|-id=116 bgcolor=#d6d6d6
| 180116 ||  || — || March 23, 2003 || Kitt Peak || Spacewatch || — || align=right | 3.8 km || 
|-id=117 bgcolor=#d6d6d6
| 180117 ||  || — || March 24, 2003 || Kitt Peak || Spacewatch || — || align=right | 3.1 km || 
|-id=118 bgcolor=#d6d6d6
| 180118 ||  || — || March 24, 2003 || Kitt Peak || Spacewatch || — || align=right | 3.8 km || 
|-id=119 bgcolor=#d6d6d6
| 180119 ||  || — || March 24, 2003 || Kitt Peak || Spacewatch || — || align=right | 3.3 km || 
|-id=120 bgcolor=#d6d6d6
| 180120 ||  || — || March 24, 2003 || Haleakala || NEAT || — || align=right | 5.0 km || 
|-id=121 bgcolor=#d6d6d6
| 180121 ||  || — || March 25, 2003 || Palomar || NEAT || — || align=right | 4.5 km || 
|-id=122 bgcolor=#d6d6d6
| 180122 ||  || — || March 25, 2003 || Palomar || NEAT || — || align=right | 4.5 km || 
|-id=123 bgcolor=#E9E9E9
| 180123 ||  || — || March 25, 2003 || Palomar || NEAT || — || align=right | 4.8 km || 
|-id=124 bgcolor=#E9E9E9
| 180124 ||  || — || March 26, 2003 || Palomar || NEAT || — || align=right | 5.0 km || 
|-id=125 bgcolor=#d6d6d6
| 180125 ||  || — || March 26, 2003 || Palomar || NEAT || — || align=right | 5.5 km || 
|-id=126 bgcolor=#d6d6d6
| 180126 ||  || — || March 26, 2003 || Palomar || NEAT || — || align=right | 4.5 km || 
|-id=127 bgcolor=#d6d6d6
| 180127 ||  || — || March 26, 2003 || Palomar || NEAT || — || align=right | 5.2 km || 
|-id=128 bgcolor=#d6d6d6
| 180128 ||  || — || March 26, 2003 || Palomar || NEAT || — || align=right | 4.9 km || 
|-id=129 bgcolor=#d6d6d6
| 180129 ||  || — || March 26, 2003 || Kitt Peak || Spacewatch || — || align=right | 3.8 km || 
|-id=130 bgcolor=#d6d6d6
| 180130 ||  || — || March 26, 2003 || Haleakala || NEAT || — || align=right | 6.5 km || 
|-id=131 bgcolor=#d6d6d6
| 180131 ||  || — || March 26, 2003 || Palomar || NEAT || — || align=right | 6.6 km || 
|-id=132 bgcolor=#d6d6d6
| 180132 ||  || — || March 28, 2003 || Kitt Peak || Spacewatch || — || align=right | 3.8 km || 
|-id=133 bgcolor=#d6d6d6
| 180133 ||  || — || March 28, 2003 || Kitt Peak || Spacewatch || — || align=right | 5.6 km || 
|-id=134 bgcolor=#d6d6d6
| 180134 ||  || — || March 29, 2003 || Anderson Mesa || LONEOS || — || align=right | 6.0 km || 
|-id=135 bgcolor=#d6d6d6
| 180135 ||  || — || March 29, 2003 || Anderson Mesa || LONEOS || — || align=right | 4.0 km || 
|-id=136 bgcolor=#d6d6d6
| 180136 ||  || — || March 26, 2003 || Powell || M. Glaze || — || align=right | 5.0 km || 
|-id=137 bgcolor=#d6d6d6
| 180137 ||  || — || March 24, 2003 || Kitt Peak || Spacewatch || — || align=right | 4.8 km || 
|-id=138 bgcolor=#d6d6d6
| 180138 ||  || — || March 24, 2003 || Kitt Peak || Spacewatch || — || align=right | 3.8 km || 
|-id=139 bgcolor=#d6d6d6
| 180139 ||  || — || March 31, 2003 || Kitt Peak || Spacewatch || — || align=right | 6.5 km || 
|-id=140 bgcolor=#d6d6d6
| 180140 ||  || — || March 24, 2003 || Kitt Peak || Spacewatch || TIR || align=right | 5.5 km || 
|-id=141 bgcolor=#d6d6d6
| 180141 Sperauskas ||  ||  || March 26, 2003 || Moletai || K. Černis, J. Zdanavičius || — || align=right | 4.5 km || 
|-id=142 bgcolor=#d6d6d6
| 180142 ||  || — || March 27, 2003 || Kitt Peak || Spacewatch || KOR || align=right | 1.7 km || 
|-id=143 bgcolor=#d6d6d6
| 180143 Gaberogers ||  ||  || March 30, 2003 || Kitt Peak || M. W. Buie || THM || align=right | 4.8 km || 
|-id=144 bgcolor=#d6d6d6
| 180144 ||  || — || April 1, 2003 || Socorro || LINEAR || — || align=right | 4.6 km || 
|-id=145 bgcolor=#d6d6d6
| 180145 ||  || — || April 2, 2003 || Socorro || LINEAR || ALA || align=right | 5.7 km || 
|-id=146 bgcolor=#d6d6d6
| 180146 ||  || — || April 3, 2003 || Anderson Mesa || LONEOS || KOR || align=right | 2.4 km || 
|-id=147 bgcolor=#d6d6d6
| 180147 ||  || — || April 2, 2003 || Socorro || LINEAR || — || align=right | 4.6 km || 
|-id=148 bgcolor=#d6d6d6
| 180148 ||  || — || April 4, 2003 || Anderson Mesa || LONEOS || — || align=right | 4.8 km || 
|-id=149 bgcolor=#d6d6d6
| 180149 ||  || — || April 3, 2003 || Anderson Mesa || LONEOS || — || align=right | 4.6 km || 
|-id=150 bgcolor=#d6d6d6
| 180150 ||  || — || April 3, 2003 || Haleakala || NEAT || — || align=right | 7.2 km || 
|-id=151 bgcolor=#d6d6d6
| 180151 ||  || — || April 4, 2003 || Kitt Peak || Spacewatch || — || align=right | 4.4 km || 
|-id=152 bgcolor=#d6d6d6
| 180152 ||  || — || April 6, 2003 || Desert Eagle || W. K. Y. Yeung || — || align=right | 5.6 km || 
|-id=153 bgcolor=#E9E9E9
| 180153 ||  || — || April 4, 2003 || Kitt Peak || Spacewatch || — || align=right | 4.9 km || 
|-id=154 bgcolor=#d6d6d6
| 180154 ||  || — || April 8, 2003 || Kitt Peak || Spacewatch || — || align=right | 3.5 km || 
|-id=155 bgcolor=#d6d6d6
| 180155 ||  || — || April 8, 2003 || Socorro || LINEAR || EOS || align=right | 2.8 km || 
|-id=156 bgcolor=#d6d6d6
| 180156 ||  || — || April 9, 2003 || Kitt Peak || Spacewatch || — || align=right | 4.2 km || 
|-id=157 bgcolor=#d6d6d6
| 180157 ||  || — || April 8, 2003 || Haleakala || NEAT || EOS || align=right | 3.1 km || 
|-id=158 bgcolor=#d6d6d6
| 180158 ||  || — || April 3, 2003 || Anderson Mesa || LONEOS || — || align=right | 5.1 km || 
|-id=159 bgcolor=#d6d6d6
| 180159 ||  || — || April 3, 2003 || Anderson Mesa || LONEOS || — || align=right | 4.2 km || 
|-id=160 bgcolor=#d6d6d6
| 180160 ||  || — || April 3, 2003 || Anderson Mesa || LONEOS || — || align=right | 4.2 km || 
|-id=161 bgcolor=#d6d6d6
| 180161 ||  || — || April 11, 2003 || Kitt Peak || Spacewatch || — || align=right | 4.7 km || 
|-id=162 bgcolor=#fefefe
| 180162 ||  || — || April 25, 2003 || Socorro || LINEAR || H || align=right | 1.1 km || 
|-id=163 bgcolor=#d6d6d6
| 180163 ||  || — || April 24, 2003 || Kitt Peak || Spacewatch || — || align=right | 4.4 km || 
|-id=164 bgcolor=#d6d6d6
| 180164 ||  || — || April 25, 2003 || Kitt Peak || Spacewatch || — || align=right | 4.0 km || 
|-id=165 bgcolor=#d6d6d6
| 180165 ||  || — || April 24, 2003 || Kitt Peak || Spacewatch || — || align=right | 4.0 km || 
|-id=166 bgcolor=#d6d6d6
| 180166 ||  || — || April 25, 2003 || Anderson Mesa || LONEOS || ALA || align=right | 6.1 km || 
|-id=167 bgcolor=#d6d6d6
| 180167 ||  || — || April 25, 2003 || Kitt Peak || Spacewatch || — || align=right | 4.5 km || 
|-id=168 bgcolor=#d6d6d6
| 180168 ||  || — || April 26, 2003 || Haleakala || NEAT || — || align=right | 4.3 km || 
|-id=169 bgcolor=#fefefe
| 180169 ||  || — || April 26, 2003 || Socorro || LINEAR || H || align=right | 1.1 km || 
|-id=170 bgcolor=#d6d6d6
| 180170 ||  || — || April 26, 2003 || Haleakala || NEAT || LIX || align=right | 5.9 km || 
|-id=171 bgcolor=#d6d6d6
| 180171 ||  || — || April 26, 2003 || Kitt Peak || Spacewatch || — || align=right | 5.5 km || 
|-id=172 bgcolor=#fefefe
| 180172 ||  || — || April 29, 2003 || Socorro || LINEAR || H || align=right data-sort-value="0.99" | 990 m || 
|-id=173 bgcolor=#d6d6d6
| 180173 ||  || — || April 29, 2003 || Socorro || LINEAR || EOS || align=right | 3.9 km || 
|-id=174 bgcolor=#d6d6d6
| 180174 ||  || — || April 28, 2003 || Socorro || LINEAR || — || align=right | 4.9 km || 
|-id=175 bgcolor=#d6d6d6
| 180175 ||  || — || April 29, 2003 || Socorro || LINEAR || — || align=right | 3.7 km || 
|-id=176 bgcolor=#d6d6d6
| 180176 ||  || — || April 24, 2003 || Anderson Mesa || LONEOS || THM || align=right | 4.5 km || 
|-id=177 bgcolor=#d6d6d6
| 180177 ||  || — || May 1, 2003 || Socorro || LINEAR || — || align=right | 3.8 km || 
|-id=178 bgcolor=#d6d6d6
| 180178 ||  || — || May 1, 2003 || Kitt Peak || Spacewatch || EUP || align=right | 6.9 km || 
|-id=179 bgcolor=#d6d6d6
| 180179 ||  || — || May 2, 2003 || Socorro || LINEAR || — || align=right | 4.9 km || 
|-id=180 bgcolor=#d6d6d6
| 180180 ||  || — || May 9, 2003 || Socorro || LINEAR || — || align=right | 5.0 km || 
|-id=181 bgcolor=#d6d6d6
| 180181 ||  || — || May 27, 2003 || Anderson Mesa || LONEOS || — || align=right | 5.3 km || 
|-id=182 bgcolor=#d6d6d6
| 180182 ||  || — || June 3, 2003 || Socorro || LINEAR || — || align=right | 7.0 km || 
|-id=183 bgcolor=#fefefe
| 180183 || 2003 MC || — || June 21, 2003 || Socorro || LINEAR || H || align=right data-sort-value="0.96" | 960 m || 
|-id=184 bgcolor=#d6d6d6
| 180184 ||  || — || June 26, 2003 || Socorro || LINEAR || — || align=right | 5.1 km || 
|-id=185 bgcolor=#fefefe
| 180185 ||  || — || July 20, 2003 || Palomar || NEAT || H || align=right | 1.0 km || 
|-id=186 bgcolor=#FFC2E0
| 180186 ||  || — || August 25, 2003 || Socorro || LINEAR || APO +1kmPHA || align=right | 1.1 km || 
|-id=187 bgcolor=#fefefe
| 180187 ||  || — || August 21, 2003 || Palomar || NEAT || — || align=right data-sort-value="0.98" | 980 m || 
|-id=188 bgcolor=#fefefe
| 180188 ||  || — || August 25, 2003 || Palomar || NEAT || NYS || align=right | 1.1 km || 
|-id=189 bgcolor=#fefefe
| 180189 ||  || — || August 23, 2003 || Socorro || LINEAR || NYS || align=right data-sort-value="0.98" | 980 m || 
|-id=190 bgcolor=#fefefe
| 180190 ||  || — || August 25, 2003 || Palomar || NEAT || — || align=right | 1.7 km || 
|-id=191 bgcolor=#fefefe
| 180191 ||  || — || September 18, 2003 || Palomar || NEAT || — || align=right data-sort-value="0.93" | 930 m || 
|-id=192 bgcolor=#fefefe
| 180192 ||  || — || September 19, 2003 || Palomar || NEAT || — || align=right | 1.8 km || 
|-id=193 bgcolor=#fefefe
| 180193 ||  || — || September 16, 2003 || Kitt Peak || Spacewatch || — || align=right data-sort-value="0.79" | 790 m || 
|-id=194 bgcolor=#fefefe
| 180194 ||  || — || September 20, 2003 || Palomar || NEAT || — || align=right | 1.6 km || 
|-id=195 bgcolor=#fefefe
| 180195 ||  || — || September 20, 2003 || Palomar || NEAT || — || align=right | 1.3 km || 
|-id=196 bgcolor=#fefefe
| 180196 ||  || — || September 20, 2003 || Palomar || NEAT || — || align=right | 1.2 km || 
|-id=197 bgcolor=#fefefe
| 180197 ||  || — || September 19, 2003 || Palomar || NEAT || FLO || align=right | 1.0 km || 
|-id=198 bgcolor=#fefefe
| 180198 ||  || — || September 24, 2003 || Haleakala || NEAT || FLO || align=right data-sort-value="0.90" | 900 m || 
|-id=199 bgcolor=#fefefe
| 180199 ||  || — || September 27, 2003 || Desert Eagle || W. K. Y. Yeung || — || align=right | 1.3 km || 
|-id=200 bgcolor=#fefefe
| 180200 ||  || — || September 26, 2003 || Socorro || LINEAR || — || align=right | 1.3 km || 
|}

180201–180300 

|-bgcolor=#fefefe
| 180201 ||  || — || September 26, 2003 || Socorro || LINEAR || — || align=right | 1.2 km || 
|-id=202 bgcolor=#fefefe
| 180202 ||  || — || September 28, 2003 || Kitt Peak || Spacewatch || FLO || align=right data-sort-value="0.73" | 730 m || 
|-id=203 bgcolor=#fefefe
| 180203 ||  || — || September 28, 2003 || Kitt Peak || Spacewatch || — || align=right data-sort-value="0.94" | 940 m || 
|-id=204 bgcolor=#fefefe
| 180204 ||  || — || September 28, 2003 || Socorro || LINEAR || ERI || align=right | 2.0 km || 
|-id=205 bgcolor=#fefefe
| 180205 ||  || — || September 28, 2003 || Socorro || LINEAR || — || align=right | 1.2 km || 
|-id=206 bgcolor=#fefefe
| 180206 ||  || — || September 18, 2003 || Haleakala || NEAT || — || align=right data-sort-value="0.83" | 830 m || 
|-id=207 bgcolor=#fefefe
| 180207 ||  || — || September 17, 2003 || Palomar || NEAT || — || align=right | 1.1 km || 
|-id=208 bgcolor=#fefefe
| 180208 ||  || — || September 29, 2003 || Socorro || LINEAR || FLO || align=right data-sort-value="0.84" | 840 m || 
|-id=209 bgcolor=#fefefe
| 180209 ||  || — || September 30, 2003 || Kitt Peak || Spacewatch || FLO || align=right data-sort-value="0.77" | 770 m || 
|-id=210 bgcolor=#fefefe
| 180210 ||  || — || September 18, 2003 || Socorro || LINEAR || — || align=right | 1.3 km || 
|-id=211 bgcolor=#fefefe
| 180211 ||  || — || October 2, 2003 || Kitt Peak || Spacewatch || FLO || align=right | 1.4 km || 
|-id=212 bgcolor=#fefefe
| 180212 ||  || — || October 16, 2003 || Palomar || NEAT || — || align=right | 1.2 km || 
|-id=213 bgcolor=#fefefe
| 180213 ||  || — || October 19, 2003 || Wrightwood || J. W. Young || — || align=right | 1.2 km || 
|-id=214 bgcolor=#FA8072
| 180214 ||  || — || October 17, 2003 || Socorro || LINEAR || PHO || align=right | 1.7 km || 
|-id=215 bgcolor=#fefefe
| 180215 ||  || — || October 16, 2003 || Kitt Peak || Spacewatch || V || align=right data-sort-value="0.92" | 920 m || 
|-id=216 bgcolor=#fefefe
| 180216 ||  || — || October 20, 2003 || Wrightwood || J. W. Young || — || align=right | 1.0 km || 
|-id=217 bgcolor=#fefefe
| 180217 ||  || — || October 22, 2003 || Kitt Peak || Spacewatch || — || align=right | 1.0 km || 
|-id=218 bgcolor=#fefefe
| 180218 ||  || — || October 22, 2003 || Kvistaberg || UDAS || FLO || align=right data-sort-value="0.85" | 850 m || 
|-id=219 bgcolor=#fefefe
| 180219 ||  || — || October 16, 2003 || Kitt Peak || Spacewatch || — || align=right data-sort-value="0.78" | 780 m || 
|-id=220 bgcolor=#fefefe
| 180220 ||  || — || October 18, 2003 || Kitt Peak || Spacewatch || — || align=right | 1.2 km || 
|-id=221 bgcolor=#fefefe
| 180221 ||  || — || October 18, 2003 || Palomar || NEAT || — || align=right | 1.2 km || 
|-id=222 bgcolor=#fefefe
| 180222 ||  || — || October 19, 2003 || Anderson Mesa || LONEOS || V || align=right | 1.0 km || 
|-id=223 bgcolor=#fefefe
| 180223 ||  || — || October 19, 2003 || Kitt Peak || Spacewatch || FLO || align=right data-sort-value="0.80" | 800 m || 
|-id=224 bgcolor=#fefefe
| 180224 ||  || — || October 19, 2003 || Kitt Peak || Spacewatch || — || align=right | 1.0 km || 
|-id=225 bgcolor=#fefefe
| 180225 ||  || — || October 21, 2003 || Kitt Peak || Spacewatch || FLO || align=right | 1.0 km || 
|-id=226 bgcolor=#E9E9E9
| 180226 ||  || — || October 18, 2003 || Palomar || NEAT || — || align=right | 2.8 km || 
|-id=227 bgcolor=#fefefe
| 180227 ||  || — || October 19, 2003 || Palomar || NEAT || V || align=right data-sort-value="0.95" | 950 m || 
|-id=228 bgcolor=#fefefe
| 180228 ||  || — || October 21, 2003 || Palomar || NEAT || — || align=right | 1.1 km || 
|-id=229 bgcolor=#fefefe
| 180229 ||  || — || October 18, 2003 || Anderson Mesa || LONEOS || — || align=right | 1.00 km || 
|-id=230 bgcolor=#E9E9E9
| 180230 ||  || — || October 18, 2003 || Palomar || NEAT || — || align=right | 1.9 km || 
|-id=231 bgcolor=#fefefe
| 180231 ||  || — || October 19, 2003 || Haleakala || NEAT || V || align=right | 1.0 km || 
|-id=232 bgcolor=#fefefe
| 180232 ||  || — || October 21, 2003 || Socorro || LINEAR || — || align=right | 1.1 km || 
|-id=233 bgcolor=#fefefe
| 180233 ||  || — || October 30, 2003 || Socorro || LINEAR || — || align=right | 1.2 km || 
|-id=234 bgcolor=#E9E9E9
| 180234 ||  || — || October 20, 2003 || Kitt Peak || Spacewatch || — || align=right | 1.7 km || 
|-id=235 bgcolor=#fefefe
| 180235 ||  || — || October 21, 2003 || Kitt Peak || Spacewatch || — || align=right | 1.0 km || 
|-id=236 bgcolor=#fefefe
| 180236 ||  || — || October 21, 2003 || Socorro || LINEAR || FLO || align=right | 1.1 km || 
|-id=237 bgcolor=#fefefe
| 180237 ||  || — || October 22, 2003 || Kitt Peak || Spacewatch || — || align=right data-sort-value="0.92" | 920 m || 
|-id=238 bgcolor=#fefefe
| 180238 ||  || — || October 22, 2003 || Socorro || LINEAR || — || align=right | 1.5 km || 
|-id=239 bgcolor=#fefefe
| 180239 ||  || — || October 23, 2003 || Kitt Peak || Spacewatch || NYS || align=right data-sort-value="0.82" | 820 m || 
|-id=240 bgcolor=#fefefe
| 180240 ||  || — || October 24, 2003 || Socorro || LINEAR || — || align=right | 1.0 km || 
|-id=241 bgcolor=#fefefe
| 180241 ||  || — || October 24, 2003 || Socorro || LINEAR || — || align=right data-sort-value="0.99" | 990 m || 
|-id=242 bgcolor=#E9E9E9
| 180242 ||  || — || October 24, 2003 || Socorro || LINEAR || — || align=right | 2.4 km || 
|-id=243 bgcolor=#fefefe
| 180243 ||  || — || October 26, 2003 || Kitt Peak || Spacewatch || — || align=right data-sort-value="0.90" | 900 m || 
|-id=244 bgcolor=#fefefe
| 180244 ||  || — || October 24, 2003 || Kitt Peak || Spacewatch || — || align=right data-sort-value="0.94" | 940 m || 
|-id=245 bgcolor=#fefefe
| 180245 ||  || — || October 25, 2003 || Socorro || LINEAR || NYS || align=right | 1.1 km || 
|-id=246 bgcolor=#fefefe
| 180246 ||  || — || October 26, 2003 || Kitt Peak || Spacewatch || — || align=right data-sort-value="0.91" | 910 m || 
|-id=247 bgcolor=#fefefe
| 180247 ||  || — || October 27, 2003 || Kitt Peak || Spacewatch || — || align=right data-sort-value="0.94" | 940 m || 
|-id=248 bgcolor=#fefefe
| 180248 ||  || — || October 27, 2003 || Kitt Peak || Spacewatch || NYS || align=right | 1.8 km || 
|-id=249 bgcolor=#fefefe
| 180249 ||  || — || October 30, 2003 || Socorro || LINEAR || FLO || align=right data-sort-value="0.96" | 960 m || 
|-id=250 bgcolor=#fefefe
| 180250 ||  || — || October 28, 2003 || Socorro || LINEAR || — || align=right | 1.2 km || 
|-id=251 bgcolor=#fefefe
| 180251 ||  || — || October 30, 2003 || Socorro || LINEAR || — || align=right | 1.3 km || 
|-id=252 bgcolor=#fefefe
| 180252 ||  || — || October 30, 2003 || Socorro || LINEAR || FLO || align=right data-sort-value="0.87" | 870 m || 
|-id=253 bgcolor=#fefefe
| 180253 ||  || — || October 24, 2003 || Kitt Peak || Spacewatch || FLO || align=right data-sort-value="0.74" | 740 m || 
|-id=254 bgcolor=#fefefe
| 180254 ||  || — || November 2, 2003 || Socorro || LINEAR || — || align=right | 1.1 km || 
|-id=255 bgcolor=#fefefe
| 180255 ||  || — || November 15, 2003 || Palomar || NEAT || LCA || align=right | 1.1 km || 
|-id=256 bgcolor=#fefefe
| 180256 ||  || — || November 15, 2003 || Palomar || NEAT || — || align=right | 1.4 km || 
|-id=257 bgcolor=#fefefe
| 180257 ||  || — || November 16, 2003 || Catalina || CSS || — || align=right | 1.2 km || 
|-id=258 bgcolor=#fefefe
| 180258 ||  || — || November 18, 2003 || Palomar || NEAT || — || align=right | 1.1 km || 
|-id=259 bgcolor=#fefefe
| 180259 ||  || — || November 16, 2003 || Kitt Peak || Spacewatch || — || align=right | 1.2 km || 
|-id=260 bgcolor=#fefefe
| 180260 ||  || — || November 18, 2003 || Palomar || NEAT || FLO || align=right data-sort-value="0.77" | 770 m || 
|-id=261 bgcolor=#fefefe
| 180261 ||  || — || November 16, 2003 || Kitt Peak || Spacewatch || — || align=right data-sort-value="0.90" | 900 m || 
|-id=262 bgcolor=#fefefe
| 180262 ||  || — || November 19, 2003 || Socorro || LINEAR || V || align=right data-sort-value="0.82" | 820 m || 
|-id=263 bgcolor=#fefefe
| 180263 ||  || — || November 19, 2003 || Socorro || LINEAR || FLO || align=right data-sort-value="0.94" | 940 m || 
|-id=264 bgcolor=#fefefe
| 180264 ||  || — || November 19, 2003 || Kitt Peak || Spacewatch || — || align=right | 1.7 km || 
|-id=265 bgcolor=#C2FFFF
| 180265 ||  || — || November 16, 2003 || Kitt Peak || Spacewatch || L5 || align=right | 12 km || 
|-id=266 bgcolor=#fefefe
| 180266 ||  || — || November 19, 2003 || Kitt Peak || Spacewatch || — || align=right | 1.3 km || 
|-id=267 bgcolor=#fefefe
| 180267 ||  || — || November 19, 2003 || Kitt Peak || Spacewatch || — || align=right data-sort-value="0.87" | 870 m || 
|-id=268 bgcolor=#fefefe
| 180268 ||  || — || November 19, 2003 || Socorro || LINEAR || V || align=right | 1.00 km || 
|-id=269 bgcolor=#fefefe
| 180269 ||  || — || November 19, 2003 || Kitt Peak || Spacewatch || FLO || align=right data-sort-value="0.92" | 920 m || 
|-id=270 bgcolor=#fefefe
| 180270 ||  || — || November 20, 2003 || Socorro || LINEAR || FLO || align=right data-sort-value="0.85" | 850 m || 
|-id=271 bgcolor=#fefefe
| 180271 ||  || — || November 19, 2003 || Socorro || LINEAR || — || align=right data-sort-value="0.90" | 900 m || 
|-id=272 bgcolor=#fefefe
| 180272 ||  || — || November 18, 2003 || Kitt Peak || Spacewatch || — || align=right | 1.1 km || 
|-id=273 bgcolor=#fefefe
| 180273 ||  || — || November 18, 2003 || Palomar || NEAT || V || align=right | 1.1 km || 
|-id=274 bgcolor=#C2FFFF
| 180274 ||  || — || November 19, 2003 || Kitt Peak || Spacewatch || L5 || align=right | 16 km || 
|-id=275 bgcolor=#fefefe
| 180275 ||  || — || November 19, 2003 || Kitt Peak || Spacewatch || — || align=right | 1.3 km || 
|-id=276 bgcolor=#fefefe
| 180276 ||  || — || November 19, 2003 || Socorro || LINEAR || — || align=right | 1.3 km || 
|-id=277 bgcolor=#fefefe
| 180277 ||  || — || November 19, 2003 || Kitt Peak || Spacewatch || — || align=right | 1.0 km || 
|-id=278 bgcolor=#E9E9E9
| 180278 ||  || — || November 20, 2003 || Palomar || NEAT || — || align=right | 2.3 km || 
|-id=279 bgcolor=#fefefe
| 180279 ||  || — || November 20, 2003 || Socorro || LINEAR || — || align=right | 1.2 km || 
|-id=280 bgcolor=#fefefe
| 180280 ||  || — || November 20, 2003 || Socorro || LINEAR || — || align=right | 1.3 km || 
|-id=281 bgcolor=#fefefe
| 180281 ||  || — || November 19, 2003 || Socorro || LINEAR || FLO || align=right data-sort-value="0.93" | 930 m || 
|-id=282 bgcolor=#fefefe
| 180282 ||  || — || November 20, 2003 || Kitt Peak || Spacewatch || — || align=right | 1.0 km || 
|-id=283 bgcolor=#fefefe
| 180283 ||  || — || November 20, 2003 || Kitt Peak || Spacewatch || — || align=right | 1.1 km || 
|-id=284 bgcolor=#fefefe
| 180284 ||  || — || November 21, 2003 || Socorro || LINEAR || — || align=right data-sort-value="0.96" | 960 m || 
|-id=285 bgcolor=#fefefe
| 180285 ||  || — || November 16, 2003 || Kitt Peak || Spacewatch || — || align=right data-sort-value="0.93" | 930 m || 
|-id=286 bgcolor=#fefefe
| 180286 ||  || — || November 18, 2003 || Palomar || NEAT || — || align=right data-sort-value="0.84" | 840 m || 
|-id=287 bgcolor=#fefefe
| 180287 ||  || — || November 19, 2003 || Anderson Mesa || LONEOS || V || align=right data-sort-value="0.95" | 950 m || 
|-id=288 bgcolor=#fefefe
| 180288 ||  || — || November 21, 2003 || Socorro || LINEAR || NYS || align=right | 1.1 km || 
|-id=289 bgcolor=#fefefe
| 180289 ||  || — || November 21, 2003 || Socorro || LINEAR || — || align=right | 1.1 km || 
|-id=290 bgcolor=#fefefe
| 180290 ||  || — || November 20, 2003 || Socorro || LINEAR || — || align=right | 1.2 km || 
|-id=291 bgcolor=#fefefe
| 180291 ||  || — || November 20, 2003 || Socorro || LINEAR || — || align=right data-sort-value="0.99" | 990 m || 
|-id=292 bgcolor=#fefefe
| 180292 ||  || — || November 20, 2003 || Socorro || LINEAR || FLO || align=right | 1.0 km || 
|-id=293 bgcolor=#fefefe
| 180293 ||  || — || November 20, 2003 || Socorro || LINEAR || — || align=right | 1.4 km || 
|-id=294 bgcolor=#fefefe
| 180294 ||  || — || November 20, 2003 || Socorro || LINEAR || — || align=right | 1.4 km || 
|-id=295 bgcolor=#fefefe
| 180295 ||  || — || November 20, 2003 || Socorro || LINEAR || — || align=right | 1.3 km || 
|-id=296 bgcolor=#fefefe
| 180296 ||  || — || November 20, 2003 || Socorro || LINEAR || FLO || align=right | 1.2 km || 
|-id=297 bgcolor=#E9E9E9
| 180297 ||  || — || November 20, 2003 || Socorro || LINEAR || JUN || align=right | 2.0 km || 
|-id=298 bgcolor=#fefefe
| 180298 ||  || — || November 21, 2003 || Socorro || LINEAR || NYS || align=right | 2.1 km || 
|-id=299 bgcolor=#fefefe
| 180299 ||  || — || November 21, 2003 || Socorro || LINEAR || NYS || align=right data-sort-value="0.80" | 800 m || 
|-id=300 bgcolor=#fefefe
| 180300 ||  || — || November 21, 2003 || Socorro || LINEAR || — || align=right | 1.5 km || 
|}

180301–180400 

|-bgcolor=#E9E9E9
| 180301 ||  || — || November 21, 2003 || Socorro || LINEAR || — || align=right | 2.7 km || 
|-id=302 bgcolor=#fefefe
| 180302 ||  || — || November 21, 2003 || Socorro || LINEAR || — || align=right | 1.5 km || 
|-id=303 bgcolor=#fefefe
| 180303 ||  || — || November 21, 2003 || Socorro || LINEAR || V || align=right | 1.1 km || 
|-id=304 bgcolor=#E9E9E9
| 180304 ||  || — || November 21, 2003 || Socorro || LINEAR || — || align=right | 1.9 km || 
|-id=305 bgcolor=#fefefe
| 180305 ||  || — || November 24, 2003 || Palomar || NEAT || — || align=right | 4.5 km || 
|-id=306 bgcolor=#fefefe
| 180306 ||  || — || November 30, 2003 || Kitt Peak || Spacewatch || — || align=right data-sort-value="0.90" | 900 m || 
|-id=307 bgcolor=#fefefe
| 180307 ||  || — || November 30, 2003 || Kitt Peak || Spacewatch || — || align=right data-sort-value="0.86" | 860 m || 
|-id=308 bgcolor=#fefefe
| 180308 ||  || — || November 20, 2003 || Catalina || CSS || — || align=right | 1.1 km || 
|-id=309 bgcolor=#FA8072
| 180309 || 2003 XR || — || December 3, 2003 || Socorro || LINEAR || — || align=right | 1.1 km || 
|-id=310 bgcolor=#fefefe
| 180310 ||  || — || December 1, 2003 || Kitt Peak || Spacewatch || V || align=right | 1.0 km || 
|-id=311 bgcolor=#fefefe
| 180311 ||  || — || December 1, 2003 || Socorro || LINEAR || FLO || align=right | 1.0 km || 
|-id=312 bgcolor=#fefefe
| 180312 ||  || — || December 1, 2003 || Socorro || LINEAR || V || align=right data-sort-value="0.95" | 950 m || 
|-id=313 bgcolor=#fefefe
| 180313 ||  || — || December 1, 2003 || Socorro || LINEAR || NYS || align=right | 1.0 km || 
|-id=314 bgcolor=#fefefe
| 180314 ||  || — || December 1, 2003 || Socorro || LINEAR || — || align=right | 1.4 km || 
|-id=315 bgcolor=#E9E9E9
| 180315 ||  || — || December 3, 2003 || Socorro || LINEAR || BAR || align=right | 2.4 km || 
|-id=316 bgcolor=#fefefe
| 180316 ||  || — || December 1, 2003 || Socorro || LINEAR || FLO || align=right | 2.3 km || 
|-id=317 bgcolor=#fefefe
| 180317 ||  || — || December 1, 2003 || Socorro || LINEAR || — || align=right | 1.2 km || 
|-id=318 bgcolor=#fefefe
| 180318 ||  || — || December 14, 2003 || Palomar || NEAT || — || align=right | 1.1 km || 
|-id=319 bgcolor=#fefefe
| 180319 ||  || — || December 14, 2003 || Kitt Peak || Spacewatch || V || align=right | 1.1 km || 
|-id=320 bgcolor=#fefefe
| 180320 ||  || — || December 1, 2003 || Socorro || LINEAR || — || align=right | 1.0 km || 
|-id=321 bgcolor=#fefefe
| 180321 ||  || — || December 4, 2003 || Socorro || LINEAR || — || align=right | 1.3 km || 
|-id=322 bgcolor=#fefefe
| 180322 ||  || — || December 17, 2003 || Črni Vrh || Črni Vrh || FLO || align=right | 1.1 km || 
|-id=323 bgcolor=#fefefe
| 180323 ||  || — || December 16, 2003 || Catalina || CSS || — || align=right | 1.3 km || 
|-id=324 bgcolor=#fefefe
| 180324 ||  || — || December 17, 2003 || Socorro || LINEAR || FLO || align=right | 1.1 km || 
|-id=325 bgcolor=#fefefe
| 180325 ||  || — || December 16, 2003 || Catalina || CSS || NYS || align=right | 1.0 km || 
|-id=326 bgcolor=#fefefe
| 180326 ||  || — || December 17, 2003 || Anderson Mesa || LONEOS || FLO || align=right | 1.3 km || 
|-id=327 bgcolor=#fefefe
| 180327 ||  || — || December 17, 2003 || Anderson Mesa || LONEOS || NYS || align=right | 1.1 km || 
|-id=328 bgcolor=#fefefe
| 180328 ||  || — || December 17, 2003 || Anderson Mesa || LONEOS || V || align=right | 1.1 km || 
|-id=329 bgcolor=#fefefe
| 180329 ||  || — || December 17, 2003 || Kitt Peak || Spacewatch || NYS || align=right data-sort-value="0.99" | 990 m || 
|-id=330 bgcolor=#fefefe
| 180330 ||  || — || December 17, 2003 || Kitt Peak || Spacewatch || — || align=right | 1.4 km || 
|-id=331 bgcolor=#fefefe
| 180331 ||  || — || December 17, 2003 || Kitt Peak || Spacewatch || — || align=right | 1.5 km || 
|-id=332 bgcolor=#fefefe
| 180332 ||  || — || December 17, 2003 || Kitt Peak || Spacewatch || NYS || align=right | 1.1 km || 
|-id=333 bgcolor=#fefefe
| 180333 ||  || — || December 17, 2003 || Kitt Peak || Spacewatch || — || align=right | 1.2 km || 
|-id=334 bgcolor=#fefefe
| 180334 ||  || — || December 18, 2003 || Socorro || LINEAR || NYS || align=right data-sort-value="0.83" | 830 m || 
|-id=335 bgcolor=#fefefe
| 180335 ||  || — || December 16, 2003 || Catalina || CSS || V || align=right data-sort-value="0.99" | 990 m || 
|-id=336 bgcolor=#fefefe
| 180336 ||  || — || December 18, 2003 || Socorro || LINEAR || — || align=right | 1.2 km || 
|-id=337 bgcolor=#fefefe
| 180337 ||  || — || December 19, 2003 || Socorro || LINEAR || NYS || align=right | 1.0 km || 
|-id=338 bgcolor=#fefefe
| 180338 ||  || — || December 18, 2003 || Kitt Peak || Spacewatch || — || align=right | 1.2 km || 
|-id=339 bgcolor=#fefefe
| 180339 ||  || — || December 19, 2003 || Kitt Peak || Spacewatch || MAS || align=right data-sort-value="0.99" | 990 m || 
|-id=340 bgcolor=#E9E9E9
| 180340 ||  || — || December 18, 2003 || Socorro || LINEAR || — || align=right | 1.5 km || 
|-id=341 bgcolor=#fefefe
| 180341 ||  || — || December 19, 2003 || Socorro || LINEAR || — || align=right | 1.4 km || 
|-id=342 bgcolor=#fefefe
| 180342 ||  || — || December 19, 2003 || Socorro || LINEAR || NYS || align=right | 1.3 km || 
|-id=343 bgcolor=#fefefe
| 180343 ||  || — || December 19, 2003 || Socorro || LINEAR || V || align=right | 1.1 km || 
|-id=344 bgcolor=#fefefe
| 180344 ||  || — || December 19, 2003 || Socorro || LINEAR || — || align=right | 1.6 km || 
|-id=345 bgcolor=#fefefe
| 180345 ||  || — || December 19, 2003 || Socorro || LINEAR || — || align=right | 1.4 km || 
|-id=346 bgcolor=#fefefe
| 180346 ||  || — || December 19, 2003 || Socorro || LINEAR || V || align=right | 1.2 km || 
|-id=347 bgcolor=#fefefe
| 180347 ||  || — || December 19, 2003 || Socorro || LINEAR || — || align=right | 1.2 km || 
|-id=348 bgcolor=#fefefe
| 180348 ||  || — || December 19, 2003 || Socorro || LINEAR || V || align=right data-sort-value="0.95" | 950 m || 
|-id=349 bgcolor=#fefefe
| 180349 ||  || — || December 18, 2003 || Socorro || LINEAR || CLA || align=right | 2.2 km || 
|-id=350 bgcolor=#E9E9E9
| 180350 ||  || — || December 18, 2003 || Socorro || LINEAR || HEN || align=right | 1.9 km || 
|-id=351 bgcolor=#fefefe
| 180351 ||  || — || December 18, 2003 || Socorro || LINEAR || MAS || align=right | 1.00 km || 
|-id=352 bgcolor=#fefefe
| 180352 ||  || — || December 18, 2003 || Socorro || LINEAR || FLO || align=right data-sort-value="0.99" | 990 m || 
|-id=353 bgcolor=#fefefe
| 180353 ||  || — || December 18, 2003 || Socorro || LINEAR || — || align=right | 1.3 km || 
|-id=354 bgcolor=#fefefe
| 180354 ||  || — || December 18, 2003 || Socorro || LINEAR || FLO || align=right | 1.00 km || 
|-id=355 bgcolor=#fefefe
| 180355 ||  || — || December 18, 2003 || Socorro || LINEAR || — || align=right | 1.3 km || 
|-id=356 bgcolor=#fefefe
| 180356 ||  || — || December 18, 2003 || Socorro || LINEAR || — || align=right | 1.0 km || 
|-id=357 bgcolor=#fefefe
| 180357 ||  || — || December 19, 2003 || Socorro || LINEAR || — || align=right | 1.9 km || 
|-id=358 bgcolor=#fefefe
| 180358 ||  || — || December 19, 2003 || Socorro || LINEAR || — || align=right | 2.7 km || 
|-id=359 bgcolor=#fefefe
| 180359 ||  || — || December 19, 2003 || Socorro || LINEAR || — || align=right | 1.1 km || 
|-id=360 bgcolor=#fefefe
| 180360 ||  || — || December 20, 2003 || Socorro || LINEAR || FLO || align=right | 1.2 km || 
|-id=361 bgcolor=#fefefe
| 180361 ||  || — || December 21, 2003 || Socorro || LINEAR || FLO || align=right | 1.1 km || 
|-id=362 bgcolor=#fefefe
| 180362 ||  || — || December 21, 2003 || Kitt Peak || Spacewatch || — || align=right | 1.4 km || 
|-id=363 bgcolor=#fefefe
| 180363 ||  || — || December 19, 2003 || Socorro || LINEAR || — || align=right | 1.4 km || 
|-id=364 bgcolor=#fefefe
| 180364 ||  || — || December 22, 2003 || Socorro || LINEAR || FLO || align=right data-sort-value="0.92" | 920 m || 
|-id=365 bgcolor=#fefefe
| 180365 ||  || — || December 22, 2003 || Kitt Peak || Spacewatch || — || align=right data-sort-value="0.99" | 990 m || 
|-id=366 bgcolor=#E9E9E9
| 180366 ||  || — || December 22, 2003 || Socorro || LINEAR || — || align=right | 1.9 km || 
|-id=367 bgcolor=#E9E9E9
| 180367 Vonfeldt ||  ||  || December 22, 2003 || Needville || D. Wells || — || align=right | 2.4 km || 
|-id=368 bgcolor=#fefefe
| 180368 ||  || — || December 27, 2003 || Desert Eagle || W. K. Y. Yeung || NYS || align=right data-sort-value="0.89" | 890 m || 
|-id=369 bgcolor=#fefefe
| 180369 ||  || — || December 23, 2003 || Socorro || LINEAR || — || align=right | 1.0 km || 
|-id=370 bgcolor=#fefefe
| 180370 ||  || — || December 27, 2003 || Socorro || LINEAR || V || align=right | 1.1 km || 
|-id=371 bgcolor=#fefefe
| 180371 ||  || — || December 27, 2003 || Socorro || LINEAR || FLO || align=right | 1.3 km || 
|-id=372 bgcolor=#fefefe
| 180372 ||  || — || December 27, 2003 || Socorro || LINEAR || FLO || align=right data-sort-value="0.97" | 970 m || 
|-id=373 bgcolor=#fefefe
| 180373 ||  || — || December 27, 2003 || Socorro || LINEAR || V || align=right | 1.0 km || 
|-id=374 bgcolor=#fefefe
| 180374 ||  || — || December 27, 2003 || Socorro || LINEAR || FLO || align=right | 1.00 km || 
|-id=375 bgcolor=#FA8072
| 180375 ||  || — || December 27, 2003 || Socorro || LINEAR || — || align=right | 1.3 km || 
|-id=376 bgcolor=#fefefe
| 180376 ||  || — || December 28, 2003 || Socorro || LINEAR || FLO || align=right data-sort-value="0.82" | 820 m || 
|-id=377 bgcolor=#fefefe
| 180377 ||  || — || December 28, 2003 || Socorro || LINEAR || — || align=right | 1.2 km || 
|-id=378 bgcolor=#fefefe
| 180378 ||  || — || December 28, 2003 || Socorro || LINEAR || — || align=right | 1.4 km || 
|-id=379 bgcolor=#fefefe
| 180379 ||  || — || December 18, 2003 || Palomar || NEAT || NYS || align=right data-sort-value="0.97" | 970 m || 
|-id=380 bgcolor=#fefefe
| 180380 ||  || — || December 28, 2003 || Socorro || LINEAR || — || align=right | 1.5 km || 
|-id=381 bgcolor=#fefefe
| 180381 ||  || — || December 28, 2003 || Socorro || LINEAR || NYS || align=right data-sort-value="0.87" | 870 m || 
|-id=382 bgcolor=#fefefe
| 180382 ||  || — || December 28, 2003 || Socorro || LINEAR || V || align=right | 1.1 km || 
|-id=383 bgcolor=#fefefe
| 180383 ||  || — || December 28, 2003 || Socorro || LINEAR || — || align=right | 1.8 km || 
|-id=384 bgcolor=#fefefe
| 180384 ||  || — || December 29, 2003 || Socorro || LINEAR || — || align=right | 1.8 km || 
|-id=385 bgcolor=#E9E9E9
| 180385 ||  || — || December 29, 2003 || Catalina || CSS || — || align=right | 4.3 km || 
|-id=386 bgcolor=#fefefe
| 180386 ||  || — || December 29, 2003 || Catalina || CSS || — || align=right | 1.5 km || 
|-id=387 bgcolor=#fefefe
| 180387 ||  || — || December 18, 2003 || Socorro || LINEAR || — || align=right | 1.3 km || 
|-id=388 bgcolor=#fefefe
| 180388 ||  || — || December 18, 2003 || Kitt Peak || Spacewatch || V || align=right | 1.0 km || 
|-id=389 bgcolor=#fefefe
| 180389 ||  || — || January 13, 2004 || Anderson Mesa || LONEOS || EUT || align=right data-sort-value="0.92" | 920 m || 
|-id=390 bgcolor=#fefefe
| 180390 ||  || — || January 13, 2004 || Anderson Mesa || LONEOS || V || align=right | 1.1 km || 
|-id=391 bgcolor=#fefefe
| 180391 ||  || — || January 13, 2004 || Anderson Mesa || LONEOS || V || align=right | 1.3 km || 
|-id=392 bgcolor=#fefefe
| 180392 ||  || — || January 13, 2004 || Anderson Mesa || LONEOS || NYS || align=right | 1.2 km || 
|-id=393 bgcolor=#fefefe
| 180393 ||  || — || January 15, 2004 || Kitt Peak || Spacewatch || MAS || align=right data-sort-value="0.90" | 900 m || 
|-id=394 bgcolor=#fefefe
| 180394 ||  || — || January 15, 2004 || Kitt Peak || Spacewatch || — || align=right | 1.4 km || 
|-id=395 bgcolor=#fefefe
| 180395 ||  || — || January 13, 2004 || Kitt Peak || Spacewatch || — || align=right | 1.1 km || 
|-id=396 bgcolor=#fefefe
| 180396 ||  || — || January 16, 2004 || Palomar || NEAT || MAS || align=right data-sort-value="0.96" | 960 m || 
|-id=397 bgcolor=#fefefe
| 180397 ||  || — || January 16, 2004 || Palomar || NEAT || NYS || align=right data-sort-value="0.92" | 920 m || 
|-id=398 bgcolor=#fefefe
| 180398 ||  || — || January 16, 2004 || Palomar || NEAT || V || align=right data-sort-value="0.96" | 960 m || 
|-id=399 bgcolor=#fefefe
| 180399 ||  || — || January 16, 2004 || Palomar || NEAT || NYS || align=right data-sort-value="0.90" | 900 m || 
|-id=400 bgcolor=#fefefe
| 180400 ||  || — || January 16, 2004 || Palomar || NEAT || — || align=right | 1.1 km || 
|}

180401–180500 

|-bgcolor=#fefefe
| 180401 ||  || — || January 17, 2004 || Palomar || NEAT || — || align=right | 3.1 km || 
|-id=402 bgcolor=#fefefe
| 180402 ||  || — || January 16, 2004 || Kitt Peak || Spacewatch || — || align=right | 1.3 km || 
|-id=403 bgcolor=#fefefe
| 180403 ||  || — || January 19, 2004 || Anderson Mesa || LONEOS || — || align=right | 1.4 km || 
|-id=404 bgcolor=#fefefe
| 180404 ||  || — || January 18, 2004 || Palomar || NEAT || MAS || align=right | 1.2 km || 
|-id=405 bgcolor=#fefefe
| 180405 ||  || — || January 18, 2004 || Palomar || NEAT || MAS || align=right | 1.1 km || 
|-id=406 bgcolor=#fefefe
| 180406 ||  || — || January 18, 2004 || Palomar || NEAT || — || align=right | 1.7 km || 
|-id=407 bgcolor=#fefefe
| 180407 ||  || — || January 19, 2004 || Kitt Peak || Spacewatch || NYS || align=right data-sort-value="0.96" | 960 m || 
|-id=408 bgcolor=#fefefe
| 180408 ||  || — || January 19, 2004 || Kitt Peak || Spacewatch || MAS || align=right | 1.2 km || 
|-id=409 bgcolor=#fefefe
| 180409 ||  || — || January 19, 2004 || Catalina || CSS || V || align=right | 1.2 km || 
|-id=410 bgcolor=#E9E9E9
| 180410 ||  || — || January 19, 2004 || Catalina || CSS || EUN || align=right | 1.8 km || 
|-id=411 bgcolor=#fefefe
| 180411 ||  || — || January 22, 2004 || Socorro || LINEAR || — || align=right | 1.3 km || 
|-id=412 bgcolor=#fefefe
| 180412 ||  || — || January 22, 2004 || Socorro || LINEAR || V || align=right | 1.0 km || 
|-id=413 bgcolor=#fefefe
| 180413 ||  || — || January 21, 2004 || Socorro || LINEAR || — || align=right | 1.7 km || 
|-id=414 bgcolor=#fefefe
| 180414 ||  || — || January 21, 2004 || Socorro || LINEAR || — || align=right | 1.5 km || 
|-id=415 bgcolor=#fefefe
| 180415 ||  || — || January 21, 2004 || Socorro || LINEAR || — || align=right | 1.6 km || 
|-id=416 bgcolor=#fefefe
| 180416 ||  || — || January 21, 2004 || Socorro || LINEAR || — || align=right | 1.5 km || 
|-id=417 bgcolor=#fefefe
| 180417 ||  || — || January 23, 2004 || Anderson Mesa || LONEOS || — || align=right | 1.6 km || 
|-id=418 bgcolor=#E9E9E9
| 180418 ||  || — || January 23, 2004 || Anderson Mesa || LONEOS || — || align=right | 2.6 km || 
|-id=419 bgcolor=#fefefe
| 180419 ||  || — || January 22, 2004 || Socorro || LINEAR || NYS || align=right data-sort-value="0.88" | 880 m || 
|-id=420 bgcolor=#fefefe
| 180420 ||  || — || January 24, 2004 || Socorro || LINEAR || — || align=right | 1.9 km || 
|-id=421 bgcolor=#fefefe
| 180421 ||  || — || January 24, 2004 || Socorro || LINEAR || — || align=right | 1.5 km || 
|-id=422 bgcolor=#E9E9E9
| 180422 ||  || — || January 23, 2004 || Anderson Mesa || LONEOS || EUN || align=right | 1.9 km || 
|-id=423 bgcolor=#fefefe
| 180423 ||  || — || January 23, 2004 || Socorro || LINEAR || — || align=right | 1.6 km || 
|-id=424 bgcolor=#fefefe
| 180424 ||  || — || January 22, 2004 || Socorro || LINEAR || — || align=right | 1.1 km || 
|-id=425 bgcolor=#E9E9E9
| 180425 ||  || — || January 22, 2004 || Socorro || LINEAR || — || align=right | 1.1 km || 
|-id=426 bgcolor=#fefefe
| 180426 ||  || — || January 26, 2004 || Anderson Mesa || LONEOS || NYS || align=right data-sort-value="0.93" | 930 m || 
|-id=427 bgcolor=#d6d6d6
| 180427 ||  || — || January 23, 2004 || Socorro || LINEAR || — || align=right | 4.7 km || 
|-id=428 bgcolor=#fefefe
| 180428 ||  || — || January 23, 2004 || Socorro || LINEAR || V || align=right | 1.2 km || 
|-id=429 bgcolor=#fefefe
| 180429 ||  || — || January 27, 2004 || Socorro || LINEAR || NYS || align=right data-sort-value="0.95" | 950 m || 
|-id=430 bgcolor=#fefefe
| 180430 ||  || — || January 27, 2004 || Anderson Mesa || LONEOS || — || align=right | 4.6 km || 
|-id=431 bgcolor=#fefefe
| 180431 ||  || — || January 24, 2004 || Socorro || LINEAR || — || align=right | 1.2 km || 
|-id=432 bgcolor=#fefefe
| 180432 ||  || — || January 24, 2004 || Socorro || LINEAR || — || align=right | 1.4 km || 
|-id=433 bgcolor=#fefefe
| 180433 ||  || — || January 27, 2004 || Kitt Peak || Spacewatch || — || align=right | 2.1 km || 
|-id=434 bgcolor=#fefefe
| 180434 ||  || — || January 29, 2004 || Socorro || LINEAR || ERI || align=right | 3.7 km || 
|-id=435 bgcolor=#fefefe
| 180435 ||  || — || January 23, 2004 || Socorro || LINEAR || — || align=right | 1.5 km || 
|-id=436 bgcolor=#fefefe
| 180436 ||  || — || January 26, 2004 || Anderson Mesa || LONEOS || — || align=right | 1.5 km || 
|-id=437 bgcolor=#fefefe
| 180437 ||  || — || January 26, 2004 || Anderson Mesa || LONEOS || ERI || align=right | 2.7 km || 
|-id=438 bgcolor=#fefefe
| 180438 ||  || — || January 27, 2004 || Kitt Peak || Spacewatch || — || align=right | 1.4 km || 
|-id=439 bgcolor=#fefefe
| 180439 ||  || — || January 28, 2004 || Catalina || CSS || — || align=right | 1.4 km || 
|-id=440 bgcolor=#fefefe
| 180440 ||  || — || January 28, 2004 || Catalina || CSS || V || align=right | 1.1 km || 
|-id=441 bgcolor=#fefefe
| 180441 ||  || — || January 28, 2004 || Catalina || CSS || V || align=right | 1.2 km || 
|-id=442 bgcolor=#fefefe
| 180442 ||  || — || January 28, 2004 || Kitt Peak || Spacewatch || MAS || align=right | 1.2 km || 
|-id=443 bgcolor=#E9E9E9
| 180443 ||  || — || January 28, 2004 || Socorro || LINEAR || — || align=right | 3.6 km || 
|-id=444 bgcolor=#fefefe
| 180444 ||  || — || January 29, 2004 || Socorro || LINEAR || NYS || align=right | 1.1 km || 
|-id=445 bgcolor=#fefefe
| 180445 ||  || — || January 26, 2004 || Anderson Mesa || LONEOS || V || align=right | 1.1 km || 
|-id=446 bgcolor=#fefefe
| 180446 ||  || — || January 26, 2004 || Anderson Mesa || LONEOS || — || align=right | 3.0 km || 
|-id=447 bgcolor=#fefefe
| 180447 ||  || — || January 29, 2004 || Socorro || LINEAR || — || align=right | 1.7 km || 
|-id=448 bgcolor=#fefefe
| 180448 ||  || — || January 16, 2004 || Palomar || NEAT || FLO || align=right | 1.2 km || 
|-id=449 bgcolor=#fefefe
| 180449 ||  || — || January 16, 2004 || Kitt Peak || Spacewatch || MAS || align=right | 1.1 km || 
|-id=450 bgcolor=#fefefe
| 180450 ||  || — || January 19, 2004 || Socorro || LINEAR || — || align=right | 2.4 km || 
|-id=451 bgcolor=#fefefe
| 180451 ||  || — || January 22, 2004 || Socorro || LINEAR || NYS || align=right data-sort-value="0.86" | 860 m || 
|-id=452 bgcolor=#fefefe
| 180452 ||  || — || January 16, 2004 || Kitt Peak || Spacewatch || V || align=right data-sort-value="0.96" | 960 m || 
|-id=453 bgcolor=#fefefe
| 180453 ||  || — || January 16, 2004 || Kitt Peak || Spacewatch || — || align=right | 1.3 km || 
|-id=454 bgcolor=#fefefe
| 180454 ||  || — || January 17, 2004 || Palomar || NEAT || — || align=right | 1.2 km || 
|-id=455 bgcolor=#fefefe
| 180455 ||  || — || January 17, 2004 || Kitt Peak || Spacewatch || — || align=right | 1.2 km || 
|-id=456 bgcolor=#fefefe
| 180456 || 2004 CN || — || February 3, 2004 || Socorro || LINEAR || — || align=right | 2.0 km || 
|-id=457 bgcolor=#fefefe
| 180457 ||  || — || February 12, 2004 || Desert Eagle || W. K. Y. Yeung || NYS || align=right | 1.1 km || 
|-id=458 bgcolor=#fefefe
| 180458 ||  || — || February 10, 2004 || Palomar || NEAT || NYS || align=right data-sort-value="0.90" | 900 m || 
|-id=459 bgcolor=#fefefe
| 180459 ||  || — || February 10, 2004 || Palomar || NEAT || NYS || align=right | 1.0 km || 
|-id=460 bgcolor=#E9E9E9
| 180460 ||  || — || February 11, 2004 || Palomar || NEAT || — || align=right | 1.5 km || 
|-id=461 bgcolor=#fefefe
| 180461 ||  || — || February 11, 2004 || Kitt Peak || Spacewatch || MAS || align=right data-sort-value="0.90" | 900 m || 
|-id=462 bgcolor=#fefefe
| 180462 ||  || — || February 10, 2004 || Palomar || NEAT || — || align=right | 1.1 km || 
|-id=463 bgcolor=#fefefe
| 180463 ||  || — || February 10, 2004 || Palomar || NEAT || NYS || align=right data-sort-value="0.96" | 960 m || 
|-id=464 bgcolor=#fefefe
| 180464 ||  || — || February 11, 2004 || Palomar || NEAT || V || align=right data-sort-value="0.92" | 920 m || 
|-id=465 bgcolor=#E9E9E9
| 180465 ||  || — || February 11, 2004 || Catalina || CSS || — || align=right | 1.8 km || 
|-id=466 bgcolor=#fefefe
| 180466 ||  || — || February 11, 2004 || Palomar || NEAT || MAS || align=right | 1.2 km || 
|-id=467 bgcolor=#fefefe
| 180467 ||  || — || February 11, 2004 || Palomar || NEAT || NYS || align=right data-sort-value="0.93" | 930 m || 
|-id=468 bgcolor=#fefefe
| 180468 ||  || — || February 12, 2004 || Kitt Peak || Spacewatch || MAS || align=right data-sort-value="0.93" | 930 m || 
|-id=469 bgcolor=#E9E9E9
| 180469 ||  || — || February 12, 2004 || Desert Eagle || W. K. Y. Yeung || — || align=right | 2.2 km || 
|-id=470 bgcolor=#fefefe
| 180470 ||  || — || February 11, 2004 || Catalina || CSS || — || align=right | 1.5 km || 
|-id=471 bgcolor=#E9E9E9
| 180471 ||  || — || February 12, 2004 || Kitt Peak || Spacewatch || — || align=right | 1.6 km || 
|-id=472 bgcolor=#fefefe
| 180472 ||  || — || February 13, 2004 || Kitt Peak || Spacewatch || FLO || align=right data-sort-value="0.99" | 990 m || 
|-id=473 bgcolor=#fefefe
| 180473 ||  || — || February 13, 2004 || Desert Eagle || W. K. Y. Yeung || FLO || align=right data-sort-value="0.91" | 910 m || 
|-id=474 bgcolor=#E9E9E9
| 180474 ||  || — || February 10, 2004 || Catalina || CSS || — || align=right | 1.2 km || 
|-id=475 bgcolor=#fefefe
| 180475 ||  || — || February 10, 2004 || Catalina || CSS || NYS || align=right | 1.2 km || 
|-id=476 bgcolor=#fefefe
| 180476 ||  || — || February 11, 2004 || Kitt Peak || Spacewatch || NYS || align=right | 1.1 km || 
|-id=477 bgcolor=#fefefe
| 180477 ||  || — || February 14, 2004 || Haleakala || NEAT || — || align=right | 1.5 km || 
|-id=478 bgcolor=#fefefe
| 180478 ||  || — || February 11, 2004 || Kitt Peak || Spacewatch || — || align=right | 1.5 km || 
|-id=479 bgcolor=#E9E9E9
| 180479 ||  || — || February 12, 2004 || Palomar || NEAT || — || align=right | 2.8 km || 
|-id=480 bgcolor=#fefefe
| 180480 ||  || — || February 10, 2004 || Catalina || CSS || — || align=right | 1.4 km || 
|-id=481 bgcolor=#fefefe
| 180481 ||  || — || February 11, 2004 || Kitt Peak || Spacewatch || — || align=right | 1.5 km || 
|-id=482 bgcolor=#E9E9E9
| 180482 ||  || — || February 11, 2004 || Palomar || NEAT || — || align=right | 1.8 km || 
|-id=483 bgcolor=#fefefe
| 180483 ||  || — || February 11, 2004 || Palomar || NEAT || V || align=right | 1.2 km || 
|-id=484 bgcolor=#E9E9E9
| 180484 ||  || — || February 13, 2004 || Kitt Peak || Spacewatch || — || align=right | 2.9 km || 
|-id=485 bgcolor=#fefefe
| 180485 ||  || — || February 13, 2004 || Kitt Peak || Spacewatch || V || align=right | 1.1 km || 
|-id=486 bgcolor=#fefefe
| 180486 ||  || — || February 14, 2004 || Haleakala || NEAT || NYS || align=right | 1.0 km || 
|-id=487 bgcolor=#fefefe
| 180487 ||  || — || February 11, 2004 || Kitt Peak || Spacewatch || — || align=right data-sort-value="0.96" | 960 m || 
|-id=488 bgcolor=#fefefe
| 180488 ||  || — || February 11, 2004 || Palomar || NEAT || NYS || align=right | 1.1 km || 
|-id=489 bgcolor=#fefefe
| 180489 ||  || — || February 11, 2004 || Palomar || NEAT || MAS || align=right | 1.2 km || 
|-id=490 bgcolor=#fefefe
| 180490 ||  || — || February 11, 2004 || Palomar || NEAT || NYS || align=right data-sort-value="0.92" | 920 m || 
|-id=491 bgcolor=#fefefe
| 180491 ||  || — || February 11, 2004 || Palomar || NEAT || MAS || align=right | 1.1 km || 
|-id=492 bgcolor=#fefefe
| 180492 ||  || — || February 11, 2004 || Palomar || NEAT || MAS || align=right | 1.0 km || 
|-id=493 bgcolor=#fefefe
| 180493 ||  || — || February 12, 2004 || Kitt Peak || Spacewatch || MAS || align=right | 1.3 km || 
|-id=494 bgcolor=#fefefe
| 180494 ||  || — || February 12, 2004 || Kitt Peak || Spacewatch || MAS || align=right | 1.1 km || 
|-id=495 bgcolor=#fefefe
| 180495 ||  || — || February 13, 2004 || Kitt Peak || Spacewatch || — || align=right | 2.6 km || 
|-id=496 bgcolor=#fefefe
| 180496 ||  || — || February 13, 2004 || Kitt Peak || Spacewatch || — || align=right | 1.2 km || 
|-id=497 bgcolor=#E9E9E9
| 180497 ||  || — || February 15, 2004 || Palomar || NEAT || — || align=right | 1.7 km || 
|-id=498 bgcolor=#fefefe
| 180498 ||  || — || February 12, 2004 || Kitt Peak || Spacewatch || — || align=right | 1.0 km || 
|-id=499 bgcolor=#fefefe
| 180499 ||  || — || February 12, 2004 || Palomar || NEAT || — || align=right | 1.5 km || 
|-id=500 bgcolor=#E9E9E9
| 180500 ||  || — || February 13, 2004 || Palomar || NEAT || — || align=right | 1.6 km || 
|}

180501–180600 

|-bgcolor=#fefefe
| 180501 ||  || — || February 14, 2004 || Haleakala || NEAT || — || align=right | 1.4 km || 
|-id=502 bgcolor=#fefefe
| 180502 ||  || — || February 11, 2004 || Kitt Peak || Spacewatch || NYS || align=right | 1.1 km || 
|-id=503 bgcolor=#E9E9E9
| 180503 ||  || — || February 14, 2004 || Catalina || CSS || — || align=right | 1.5 km || 
|-id=504 bgcolor=#E9E9E9
| 180504 ||  || — || February 15, 2004 || Catalina || CSS || — || align=right | 2.5 km || 
|-id=505 bgcolor=#fefefe
| 180505 ||  || — || February 15, 2004 || Catalina || CSS || SUL || align=right | 4.3 km || 
|-id=506 bgcolor=#E9E9E9
| 180506 ||  || — || February 15, 2004 || Catalina || CSS || — || align=right | 2.7 km || 
|-id=507 bgcolor=#fefefe
| 180507 ||  || — || February 11, 2004 || Palomar || NEAT || NYS || align=right data-sort-value="0.93" | 930 m || 
|-id=508 bgcolor=#fefefe
| 180508 ||  || — || February 14, 2004 || Kitt Peak || Spacewatch || NYS || align=right | 1.1 km || 
|-id=509 bgcolor=#fefefe
| 180509 ||  || — || February 16, 2004 || Kitt Peak || Spacewatch || — || align=right | 1.4 km || 
|-id=510 bgcolor=#fefefe
| 180510 ||  || — || February 16, 2004 || Kitt Peak || Spacewatch || — || align=right | 1.3 km || 
|-id=511 bgcolor=#fefefe
| 180511 ||  || — || February 17, 2004 || Kitt Peak || Spacewatch || V || align=right | 1.3 km || 
|-id=512 bgcolor=#E9E9E9
| 180512 ||  || — || February 17, 2004 || Socorro || LINEAR || — || align=right | 2.2 km || 
|-id=513 bgcolor=#fefefe
| 180513 ||  || — || February 18, 2004 || Socorro || LINEAR || MAS || align=right data-sort-value="0.94" | 940 m || 
|-id=514 bgcolor=#E9E9E9
| 180514 ||  || — || February 17, 2004 || Socorro || LINEAR || — || align=right | 4.8 km || 
|-id=515 bgcolor=#fefefe
| 180515 ||  || — || February 16, 2004 || Socorro || LINEAR || — || align=right | 1.2 km || 
|-id=516 bgcolor=#fefefe
| 180516 ||  || — || February 17, 2004 || Socorro || LINEAR || NYS || align=right data-sort-value="0.97" | 970 m || 
|-id=517 bgcolor=#fefefe
| 180517 ||  || — || February 17, 2004 || Socorro || LINEAR || — || align=right | 1.2 km || 
|-id=518 bgcolor=#fefefe
| 180518 ||  || — || February 18, 2004 || Kitt Peak || Spacewatch || — || align=right | 1.3 km || 
|-id=519 bgcolor=#fefefe
| 180519 ||  || — || February 18, 2004 || Socorro || LINEAR || NYS || align=right | 1.6 km || 
|-id=520 bgcolor=#E9E9E9
| 180520 ||  || — || February 18, 2004 || Socorro || LINEAR || — || align=right | 1.4 km || 
|-id=521 bgcolor=#E9E9E9
| 180521 ||  || — || February 19, 2004 || Socorro || LINEAR || — || align=right | 1.6 km || 
|-id=522 bgcolor=#fefefe
| 180522 ||  || — || February 19, 2004 || Socorro || LINEAR || — || align=right | 1.9 km || 
|-id=523 bgcolor=#E9E9E9
| 180523 ||  || — || February 20, 2004 || Kleť || Kleť Obs. || — || align=right | 2.3 km || 
|-id=524 bgcolor=#fefefe
| 180524 ||  || — || February 22, 2004 || Kitt Peak || Spacewatch || — || align=right | 1.1 km || 
|-id=525 bgcolor=#E9E9E9
| 180525 ||  || — || February 19, 2004 || Socorro || LINEAR || RAF || align=right | 1.5 km || 
|-id=526 bgcolor=#fefefe
| 180526 ||  || — || February 23, 2004 || Socorro || LINEAR || — || align=right | 2.4 km || 
|-id=527 bgcolor=#E9E9E9
| 180527 ||  || — || February 19, 2004 || Socorro || LINEAR || — || align=right | 1.4 km || 
|-id=528 bgcolor=#E9E9E9
| 180528 ||  || — || February 19, 2004 || Socorro || LINEAR || MAR || align=right | 1.8 km || 
|-id=529 bgcolor=#E9E9E9
| 180529 ||  || — || February 19, 2004 || Socorro || LINEAR || — || align=right | 1.9 km || 
|-id=530 bgcolor=#fefefe
| 180530 ||  || — || February 23, 2004 || Socorro || LINEAR || — || align=right | 1.2 km || 
|-id=531 bgcolor=#E9E9E9
| 180531 ||  || — || February 22, 2004 || Kitt Peak || Spacewatch || — || align=right | 3.7 km || 
|-id=532 bgcolor=#E9E9E9
| 180532 ||  || — || February 25, 2004 || Socorro || LINEAR || — || align=right | 1.4 km || 
|-id=533 bgcolor=#E9E9E9
| 180533 ||  || — || February 26, 2004 || Socorro || LINEAR || — || align=right | 1.1 km || 
|-id=534 bgcolor=#E9E9E9
| 180534 ||  || — || February 17, 2004 || Kitt Peak || Spacewatch || MAR || align=right | 1.4 km || 
|-id=535 bgcolor=#E9E9E9
| 180535 ||  || — || February 18, 2004 || Socorro || LINEAR || — || align=right | 2.6 km || 
|-id=536 bgcolor=#E9E9E9
| 180536 || 2004 EV || — || March 1, 2004 || Catalina || CSS || — || align=right | 1.8 km || 
|-id=537 bgcolor=#E9E9E9
| 180537 ||  || — || March 14, 2004 || Wrightwood || J. W. Young || MAR || align=right | 1.9 km || 
|-id=538 bgcolor=#E9E9E9
| 180538 ||  || — || March 11, 2004 || Palomar || NEAT || — || align=right | 1.4 km || 
|-id=539 bgcolor=#E9E9E9
| 180539 ||  || — || March 13, 2004 || Palomar || NEAT || — || align=right | 2.0 km || 
|-id=540 bgcolor=#d6d6d6
| 180540 ||  || — || March 11, 2004 || Palomar || NEAT || — || align=right | 3.3 km || 
|-id=541 bgcolor=#E9E9E9
| 180541 ||  || — || March 15, 2004 || Desert Eagle || W. K. Y. Yeung || — || align=right | 1.4 km || 
|-id=542 bgcolor=#E9E9E9
| 180542 ||  || — || March 10, 2004 || Palomar || NEAT || — || align=right | 1.5 km || 
|-id=543 bgcolor=#E9E9E9
| 180543 ||  || — || March 11, 2004 || Palomar || NEAT || — || align=right | 1.6 km || 
|-id=544 bgcolor=#fefefe
| 180544 ||  || — || March 12, 2004 || Palomar || NEAT || NYS || align=right data-sort-value="0.98" | 980 m || 
|-id=545 bgcolor=#E9E9E9
| 180545 ||  || — || March 12, 2004 || Palomar || NEAT || — || align=right | 1.4 km || 
|-id=546 bgcolor=#E9E9E9
| 180546 ||  || — || March 12, 2004 || Palomar || NEAT || — || align=right | 1.6 km || 
|-id=547 bgcolor=#E9E9E9
| 180547 ||  || — || March 12, 2004 || Palomar || NEAT || RAF || align=right | 1.5 km || 
|-id=548 bgcolor=#E9E9E9
| 180548 ||  || — || March 12, 2004 || Palomar || NEAT || — || align=right | 2.6 km || 
|-id=549 bgcolor=#E9E9E9
| 180549 ||  || — || March 14, 2004 || Socorro || LINEAR || EUN || align=right | 1.7 km || 
|-id=550 bgcolor=#E9E9E9
| 180550 ||  || — || March 15, 2004 || Socorro || LINEAR || BAR || align=right | 1.9 km || 
|-id=551 bgcolor=#E9E9E9
| 180551 ||  || — || March 15, 2004 || Socorro || LINEAR || — || align=right | 1.4 km || 
|-id=552 bgcolor=#fefefe
| 180552 ||  || — || March 15, 2004 || Catalina || CSS || V || align=right | 1.1 km || 
|-id=553 bgcolor=#E9E9E9
| 180553 ||  || — || March 15, 2004 || Goodricke-Pigott || Goodricke-Pigott Obs. || — || align=right | 2.3 km || 
|-id=554 bgcolor=#E9E9E9
| 180554 ||  || — || March 15, 2004 || Črni Vrh || Črni Vrh || — || align=right | 1.3 km || 
|-id=555 bgcolor=#fefefe
| 180555 ||  || — || March 13, 2004 || Palomar || NEAT || — || align=right | 2.0 km || 
|-id=556 bgcolor=#E9E9E9
| 180556 ||  || — || March 13, 2004 || Palomar || NEAT || WIT || align=right | 1.6 km || 
|-id=557 bgcolor=#E9E9E9
| 180557 ||  || — || March 12, 2004 || Palomar || NEAT || — || align=right | 1.3 km || 
|-id=558 bgcolor=#E9E9E9
| 180558 ||  || — || March 15, 2004 || Kitt Peak || Spacewatch || — || align=right | 1.2 km || 
|-id=559 bgcolor=#E9E9E9
| 180559 ||  || — || March 15, 2004 || Socorro || LINEAR || — || align=right | 1.9 km || 
|-id=560 bgcolor=#E9E9E9
| 180560 ||  || — || March 15, 2004 || Campo Imperatore || CINEOS || — || align=right | 1.4 km || 
|-id=561 bgcolor=#E9E9E9
| 180561 ||  || — || March 14, 2004 || Palomar || NEAT || — || align=right | 2.6 km || 
|-id=562 bgcolor=#E9E9E9
| 180562 ||  || — || March 14, 2004 || Kitt Peak || Spacewatch || — || align=right | 1.6 km || 
|-id=563 bgcolor=#E9E9E9
| 180563 ||  || — || March 15, 2004 || Kitt Peak || Spacewatch || HNS || align=right | 1.7 km || 
|-id=564 bgcolor=#d6d6d6
| 180564 ||  || — || March 15, 2004 || Socorro || LINEAR || — || align=right | 3.8 km || 
|-id=565 bgcolor=#E9E9E9
| 180565 ||  || — || March 15, 2004 || Kitt Peak || Spacewatch || MIS || align=right | 3.3 km || 
|-id=566 bgcolor=#E9E9E9
| 180566 ||  || — || March 15, 2004 || Catalina || CSS || — || align=right | 3.3 km || 
|-id=567 bgcolor=#E9E9E9
| 180567 ||  || — || March 15, 2004 || Catalina || CSS || — || align=right | 3.2 km || 
|-id=568 bgcolor=#E9E9E9
| 180568 ||  || — || March 14, 2004 || Palomar || NEAT || — || align=right | 2.0 km || 
|-id=569 bgcolor=#E9E9E9
| 180569 ||  || — || March 14, 2004 || Palomar || NEAT || — || align=right | 1.6 km || 
|-id=570 bgcolor=#E9E9E9
| 180570 ||  || — || March 15, 2004 || Kitt Peak || Spacewatch || — || align=right | 1.6 km || 
|-id=571 bgcolor=#E9E9E9
| 180571 ||  || — || March 15, 2004 || Kitt Peak || Spacewatch || — || align=right | 3.4 km || 
|-id=572 bgcolor=#fefefe
| 180572 ||  || — || March 15, 2004 || Kitt Peak || Spacewatch || NYS || align=right data-sort-value="0.87" | 870 m || 
|-id=573 bgcolor=#E9E9E9
| 180573 ||  || — || March 15, 2004 || Kitt Peak || Spacewatch || — || align=right | 3.6 km || 
|-id=574 bgcolor=#E9E9E9
| 180574 ||  || — || March 15, 2004 || Kitt Peak || Spacewatch || — || align=right | 1.8 km || 
|-id=575 bgcolor=#E9E9E9
| 180575 ||  || — || March 16, 2004 || Socorro || LINEAR || — || align=right | 3.7 km || 
|-id=576 bgcolor=#E9E9E9
| 180576 ||  || — || March 16, 2004 || Palomar || NEAT || — || align=right | 2.0 km || 
|-id=577 bgcolor=#E9E9E9
| 180577 ||  || — || March 16, 2004 || Campo Imperatore || CINEOS || — || align=right | 2.1 km || 
|-id=578 bgcolor=#E9E9E9
| 180578 ||  || — || March 28, 2004 || Desert Eagle || W. K. Y. Yeung || — || align=right | 1.2 km || 
|-id=579 bgcolor=#E9E9E9
| 180579 ||  || — || March 16, 2004 || Socorro || LINEAR || ADE || align=right | 2.8 km || 
|-id=580 bgcolor=#fefefe
| 180580 ||  || — || March 16, 2004 || Socorro || LINEAR || — || align=right | 1.4 km || 
|-id=581 bgcolor=#fefefe
| 180581 ||  || — || March 16, 2004 || Catalina || CSS || — || align=right | 1.2 km || 
|-id=582 bgcolor=#fefefe
| 180582 ||  || — || March 17, 2004 || Kitt Peak || Spacewatch || NYS || align=right data-sort-value="0.77" | 770 m || 
|-id=583 bgcolor=#E9E9E9
| 180583 ||  || — || March 17, 2004 || Socorro || LINEAR || — || align=right | 1.8 km || 
|-id=584 bgcolor=#E9E9E9
| 180584 ||  || — || March 17, 2004 || Kitt Peak || Spacewatch || — || align=right | 1.2 km || 
|-id=585 bgcolor=#E9E9E9
| 180585 ||  || — || March 16, 2004 || Kitt Peak || Spacewatch || — || align=right | 1.8 km || 
|-id=586 bgcolor=#E9E9E9
| 180586 ||  || — || March 16, 2004 || Socorro || LINEAR || — || align=right | 2.3 km || 
|-id=587 bgcolor=#E9E9E9
| 180587 ||  || — || March 16, 2004 || Socorro || LINEAR || — || align=right | 3.6 km || 
|-id=588 bgcolor=#E9E9E9
| 180588 ||  || — || March 18, 2004 || Socorro || LINEAR || — || align=right | 2.2 km || 
|-id=589 bgcolor=#E9E9E9
| 180589 ||  || — || March 21, 2004 || Anderson Mesa || LONEOS || JUN || align=right | 1.7 km || 
|-id=590 bgcolor=#E9E9E9
| 180590 ||  || — || March 16, 2004 || Desert Eagle || W. K. Y. Yeung || — || align=right | 3.5 km || 
|-id=591 bgcolor=#fefefe
| 180591 ||  || — || March 18, 2004 || Kitt Peak || Spacewatch || — || align=right | 1.5 km || 
|-id=592 bgcolor=#E9E9E9
| 180592 ||  || — || March 18, 2004 || Socorro || LINEAR || — || align=right | 1.5 km || 
|-id=593 bgcolor=#fefefe
| 180593 ||  || — || March 19, 2004 || Palomar || NEAT || V || align=right | 1.1 km || 
|-id=594 bgcolor=#fefefe
| 180594 ||  || — || March 19, 2004 || Socorro || LINEAR || NYS || align=right | 1.0 km || 
|-id=595 bgcolor=#E9E9E9
| 180595 ||  || — || March 19, 2004 || Socorro || LINEAR || HNS || align=right | 1.8 km || 
|-id=596 bgcolor=#E9E9E9
| 180596 ||  || — || March 19, 2004 || Socorro || LINEAR || — || align=right | 2.7 km || 
|-id=597 bgcolor=#E9E9E9
| 180597 ||  || — || March 19, 2004 || Socorro || LINEAR || — || align=right | 2.3 km || 
|-id=598 bgcolor=#E9E9E9
| 180598 ||  || — || March 19, 2004 || Socorro || LINEAR || MIS || align=right | 3.9 km || 
|-id=599 bgcolor=#E9E9E9
| 180599 ||  || — || March 20, 2004 || Haleakala || NEAT || EUN || align=right | 1.3 km || 
|-id=600 bgcolor=#E9E9E9
| 180600 ||  || — || March 20, 2004 || Kitt Peak || Spacewatch || HEN || align=right | 1.4 km || 
|}

180601–180700 

|-bgcolor=#E9E9E9
| 180601 ||  || — || March 16, 2004 || Socorro || LINEAR || BRU || align=right | 4.9 km || 
|-id=602 bgcolor=#E9E9E9
| 180602 ||  || — || March 17, 2004 || Kitt Peak || Spacewatch || — || align=right | 3.3 km || 
|-id=603 bgcolor=#E9E9E9
| 180603 ||  || — || March 18, 2004 || Kitt Peak || Spacewatch || — || align=right | 3.3 km || 
|-id=604 bgcolor=#E9E9E9
| 180604 ||  || — || March 20, 2004 || Socorro || LINEAR || — || align=right | 1.7 km || 
|-id=605 bgcolor=#E9E9E9
| 180605 ||  || — || March 29, 2004 || Socorro || LINEAR || — || align=right | 4.0 km || 
|-id=606 bgcolor=#E9E9E9
| 180606 ||  || — || March 22, 2004 || Socorro || LINEAR || — || align=right | 1.5 km || 
|-id=607 bgcolor=#E9E9E9
| 180607 ||  || — || March 23, 2004 || Kitt Peak || Spacewatch || — || align=right | 1.6 km || 
|-id=608 bgcolor=#fefefe
| 180608 ||  || — || March 23, 2004 || Socorro || LINEAR || — || align=right | 1.5 km || 
|-id=609 bgcolor=#E9E9E9
| 180609 ||  || — || March 23, 2004 || Socorro || LINEAR || — || align=right | 4.3 km || 
|-id=610 bgcolor=#E9E9E9
| 180610 ||  || — || March 23, 2004 || Kitt Peak || Spacewatch || HEN || align=right | 1.4 km || 
|-id=611 bgcolor=#E9E9E9
| 180611 ||  || — || March 23, 2004 || Socorro || LINEAR || — || align=right | 3.3 km || 
|-id=612 bgcolor=#E9E9E9
| 180612 ||  || — || March 20, 2004 || Socorro || LINEAR || — || align=right | 1.5 km || 
|-id=613 bgcolor=#E9E9E9
| 180613 ||  || — || March 23, 2004 || Kitt Peak || Spacewatch || — || align=right | 3.7 km || 
|-id=614 bgcolor=#E9E9E9
| 180614 ||  || — || March 23, 2004 || Socorro || LINEAR || — || align=right | 3.3 km || 
|-id=615 bgcolor=#E9E9E9
| 180615 ||  || — || March 22, 2004 || Socorro || LINEAR || — || align=right | 1.3 km || 
|-id=616 bgcolor=#E9E9E9
| 180616 ||  || — || March 22, 2004 || Socorro || LINEAR || — || align=right | 3.4 km || 
|-id=617 bgcolor=#E9E9E9
| 180617 ||  || — || March 22, 2004 || Socorro || LINEAR || — || align=right | 3.5 km || 
|-id=618 bgcolor=#E9E9E9
| 180618 ||  || — || March 23, 2004 || Socorro || LINEAR || — || align=right | 2.4 km || 
|-id=619 bgcolor=#E9E9E9
| 180619 ||  || — || March 24, 2004 || Anderson Mesa || LONEOS || — || align=right | 3.4 km || 
|-id=620 bgcolor=#E9E9E9
| 180620 ||  || — || March 27, 2004 || Socorro || LINEAR || — || align=right | 3.3 km || 
|-id=621 bgcolor=#E9E9E9
| 180621 ||  || — || March 27, 2004 || Socorro || LINEAR || — || align=right | 2.6 km || 
|-id=622 bgcolor=#E9E9E9
| 180622 ||  || — || March 27, 2004 || Socorro || LINEAR || — || align=right | 2.6 km || 
|-id=623 bgcolor=#E9E9E9
| 180623 ||  || — || March 27, 2004 || Socorro || LINEAR || — || align=right | 2.9 km || 
|-id=624 bgcolor=#E9E9E9
| 180624 ||  || — || March 27, 2004 || Socorro || LINEAR || — || align=right | 1.7 km || 
|-id=625 bgcolor=#E9E9E9
| 180625 ||  || — || March 26, 2004 || Socorro || LINEAR || — || align=right | 2.6 km || 
|-id=626 bgcolor=#E9E9E9
| 180626 ||  || — || March 27, 2004 || Anderson Mesa || LONEOS || EUN || align=right | 2.1 km || 
|-id=627 bgcolor=#E9E9E9
| 180627 ||  || — || March 28, 2004 || Anderson Mesa || LONEOS || — || align=right | 3.0 km || 
|-id=628 bgcolor=#E9E9E9
| 180628 ||  || — || March 28, 2004 || Catalina || CSS || — || align=right | 3.8 km || 
|-id=629 bgcolor=#E9E9E9
| 180629 ||  || — || March 26, 2004 || Socorro || LINEAR || — || align=right | 2.0 km || 
|-id=630 bgcolor=#E9E9E9
| 180630 ||  || — || March 27, 2004 || Socorro || LINEAR || JUN || align=right | 1.6 km || 
|-id=631 bgcolor=#E9E9E9
| 180631 ||  || — || March 19, 2004 || Socorro || LINEAR || — || align=right | 3.7 km || 
|-id=632 bgcolor=#E9E9E9
| 180632 ||  || — || March 18, 2004 || Socorro || LINEAR || — || align=right | 2.3 km || 
|-id=633 bgcolor=#E9E9E9
| 180633 ||  || — || March 18, 2004 || Socorro || LINEAR || — || align=right | 1.2 km || 
|-id=634 bgcolor=#fefefe
| 180634 ||  || — || March 18, 2004 || Kitt Peak || Spacewatch || NYS || align=right | 1.3 km || 
|-id=635 bgcolor=#E9E9E9
| 180635 ||  || — || March 27, 2004 || Socorro || LINEAR || — || align=right | 2.7 km || 
|-id=636 bgcolor=#E9E9E9
| 180636 ||  || — || April 11, 2004 || Palomar || NEAT || — || align=right | 1.8 km || 
|-id=637 bgcolor=#E9E9E9
| 180637 ||  || — || April 11, 2004 || Palomar || NEAT || — || align=right | 2.3 km || 
|-id=638 bgcolor=#E9E9E9
| 180638 ||  || — || April 12, 2004 || Kitt Peak || Spacewatch || — || align=right | 1.9 km || 
|-id=639 bgcolor=#d6d6d6
| 180639 ||  || — || April 12, 2004 || Kitt Peak || Spacewatch || — || align=right | 3.5 km || 
|-id=640 bgcolor=#E9E9E9
| 180640 ||  || — || April 13, 2004 || Catalina || CSS || — || align=right | 1.9 km || 
|-id=641 bgcolor=#E9E9E9
| 180641 ||  || — || April 13, 2004 || Kitt Peak || Spacewatch || — || align=right | 2.9 km || 
|-id=642 bgcolor=#E9E9E9
| 180642 ||  || — || April 12, 2004 || Kitt Peak || Spacewatch || — || align=right | 3.1 km || 
|-id=643 bgcolor=#E9E9E9
| 180643 Cardoen ||  ||  || April 14, 2004 || Vicques || M. Ory || — || align=right | 1.3 km || 
|-id=644 bgcolor=#E9E9E9
| 180644 ||  || — || April 12, 2004 || Palomar || NEAT || — || align=right | 1.9 km || 
|-id=645 bgcolor=#E9E9E9
| 180645 ||  || — || April 12, 2004 || Kitt Peak || Spacewatch || — || align=right | 3.2 km || 
|-id=646 bgcolor=#E9E9E9
| 180646 ||  || — || April 14, 2004 || Kitt Peak || Spacewatch || — || align=right | 2.3 km || 
|-id=647 bgcolor=#E9E9E9
| 180647 ||  || — || April 15, 2004 || Palomar || NEAT || — || align=right | 3.5 km || 
|-id=648 bgcolor=#E9E9E9
| 180648 ||  || — || April 12, 2004 || Kitt Peak || Spacewatch || — || align=right | 2.4 km || 
|-id=649 bgcolor=#E9E9E9
| 180649 ||  || — || April 12, 2004 || Kitt Peak || Spacewatch || — || align=right | 2.1 km || 
|-id=650 bgcolor=#E9E9E9
| 180650 ||  || — || April 12, 2004 || Palomar || NEAT || — || align=right | 2.0 km || 
|-id=651 bgcolor=#E9E9E9
| 180651 ||  || — || April 12, 2004 || Kitt Peak || Spacewatch || — || align=right | 4.5 km || 
|-id=652 bgcolor=#E9E9E9
| 180652 ||  || — || April 12, 2004 || Siding Spring || SSS || ADE || align=right | 4.5 km || 
|-id=653 bgcolor=#E9E9E9
| 180653 ||  || — || April 13, 2004 || Kitt Peak || Spacewatch || — || align=right | 2.1 km || 
|-id=654 bgcolor=#E9E9E9
| 180654 ||  || — || April 13, 2004 || Palomar || NEAT || — || align=right | 3.9 km || 
|-id=655 bgcolor=#E9E9E9
| 180655 ||  || — || April 13, 2004 || Palomar || NEAT || — || align=right | 1.8 km || 
|-id=656 bgcolor=#E9E9E9
| 180656 ||  || — || April 13, 2004 || Palomar || NEAT || — || align=right | 2.7 km || 
|-id=657 bgcolor=#E9E9E9
| 180657 ||  || — || April 13, 2004 || Palomar || NEAT || — || align=right | 1.7 km || 
|-id=658 bgcolor=#E9E9E9
| 180658 ||  || — || April 11, 2004 || Palomar || NEAT || DOR || align=right | 4.3 km || 
|-id=659 bgcolor=#E9E9E9
| 180659 ||  || — || April 13, 2004 || Palomar || NEAT || — || align=right | 3.0 km || 
|-id=660 bgcolor=#E9E9E9
| 180660 ||  || — || April 15, 2004 || Catalina || CSS || — || align=right | 3.1 km || 
|-id=661 bgcolor=#E9E9E9
| 180661 ||  || — || April 15, 2004 || Palomar || NEAT || — || align=right | 2.6 km || 
|-id=662 bgcolor=#E9E9E9
| 180662 ||  || — || April 12, 2004 || Kitt Peak || Spacewatch || — || align=right | 2.2 km || 
|-id=663 bgcolor=#E9E9E9
| 180663 ||  || — || April 12, 2004 || Kitt Peak || Spacewatch || AGN || align=right | 1.3 km || 
|-id=664 bgcolor=#E9E9E9
| 180664 ||  || — || April 14, 2004 || Kitt Peak || Spacewatch || HEN || align=right | 1.9 km || 
|-id=665 bgcolor=#E9E9E9
| 180665 ||  || — || April 14, 2004 || Kitt Peak || Spacewatch || — || align=right | 3.6 km || 
|-id=666 bgcolor=#E9E9E9
| 180666 ||  || — || April 15, 2004 || Anderson Mesa || LONEOS || — || align=right | 4.2 km || 
|-id=667 bgcolor=#E9E9E9
| 180667 ||  || — || April 13, 2004 || Kitt Peak || Spacewatch || — || align=right | 1.2 km || 
|-id=668 bgcolor=#E9E9E9
| 180668 ||  || — || April 13, 2004 || Kitt Peak || Spacewatch || — || align=right | 2.0 km || 
|-id=669 bgcolor=#E9E9E9
| 180669 ||  || — || April 13, 2004 || Kitt Peak || Spacewatch || — || align=right | 1.6 km || 
|-id=670 bgcolor=#E9E9E9
| 180670 ||  || — || April 14, 2004 || Kitt Peak || Spacewatch || HOF || align=right | 4.8 km || 
|-id=671 bgcolor=#E9E9E9
| 180671 ||  || — || April 14, 2004 || Anderson Mesa || LONEOS || — || align=right | 4.0 km || 
|-id=672 bgcolor=#d6d6d6
| 180672 ||  || — || April 13, 2004 || Siding Spring || SSS || — || align=right | 4.5 km || 
|-id=673 bgcolor=#E9E9E9
| 180673 ||  || — || April 15, 2004 || Palomar || NEAT || — || align=right | 1.7 km || 
|-id=674 bgcolor=#E9E9E9
| 180674 ||  || — || April 15, 2004 || Palomar || NEAT || ADE || align=right | 3.0 km || 
|-id=675 bgcolor=#E9E9E9
| 180675 ||  || — || April 14, 2004 || Socorro || LINEAR || GER || align=right | 2.6 km || 
|-id=676 bgcolor=#E9E9E9
| 180676 ||  || — || April 14, 2004 || Socorro || LINEAR || — || align=right | 1.8 km || 
|-id=677 bgcolor=#E9E9E9
| 180677 ||  || — || April 12, 2004 || Kitt Peak || Spacewatch || — || align=right | 3.2 km || 
|-id=678 bgcolor=#E9E9E9
| 180678 ||  || — || April 13, 2004 || Catalina || CSS || — || align=right | 4.0 km || 
|-id=679 bgcolor=#E9E9E9
| 180679 ||  || — || April 14, 2004 || Kitt Peak || Spacewatch || — || align=right | 2.3 km || 
|-id=680 bgcolor=#E9E9E9
| 180680 ||  || — || April 14, 2004 || Kitt Peak || Spacewatch || — || align=right | 2.3 km || 
|-id=681 bgcolor=#E9E9E9
| 180681 ||  || — || April 14, 2004 || Siding Spring || SSS || — || align=right | 3.8 km || 
|-id=682 bgcolor=#E9E9E9
| 180682 ||  || — || April 15, 2004 || Palomar || NEAT || — || align=right | 3.0 km || 
|-id=683 bgcolor=#E9E9E9
| 180683 || 2004 HF || — || April 16, 2004 || Emerald Lane || L. Ball || — || align=right | 3.7 km || 
|-id=684 bgcolor=#E9E9E9
| 180684 ||  || — || April 20, 2004 || Desert Eagle || W. K. Y. Yeung || — || align=right | 3.6 km || 
|-id=685 bgcolor=#E9E9E9
| 180685 ||  || — || April 17, 2004 || Socorro || LINEAR || ADE || align=right | 5.9 km || 
|-id=686 bgcolor=#E9E9E9
| 180686 ||  || — || April 17, 2004 || Socorro || LINEAR || — || align=right | 4.1 km || 
|-id=687 bgcolor=#E9E9E9
| 180687 ||  || — || April 19, 2004 || Socorro || LINEAR || — || align=right | 1.9 km || 
|-id=688 bgcolor=#E9E9E9
| 180688 ||  || — || April 17, 2004 || Socorro || LINEAR || — || align=right | 4.0 km || 
|-id=689 bgcolor=#d6d6d6
| 180689 ||  || — || April 17, 2004 || Anderson Mesa || LONEOS || — || align=right | 4.1 km || 
|-id=690 bgcolor=#d6d6d6
| 180690 ||  || — || April 16, 2004 || Kitt Peak || Spacewatch || KOR || align=right | 1.5 km || 
|-id=691 bgcolor=#E9E9E9
| 180691 ||  || — || April 19, 2004 || Socorro || LINEAR || — || align=right | 2.5 km || 
|-id=692 bgcolor=#E9E9E9
| 180692 ||  || — || April 16, 2004 || Palomar || NEAT || MAR || align=right | 1.8 km || 
|-id=693 bgcolor=#E9E9E9
| 180693 ||  || — || April 19, 2004 || Socorro || LINEAR || — || align=right | 3.6 km || 
|-id=694 bgcolor=#E9E9E9
| 180694 ||  || — || April 20, 2004 || Socorro || LINEAR || — || align=right | 2.3 km || 
|-id=695 bgcolor=#E9E9E9
| 180695 ||  || — || April 21, 2004 || Reedy Creek || J. Broughton || — || align=right | 5.1 km || 
|-id=696 bgcolor=#E9E9E9
| 180696 ||  || — || April 19, 2004 || Socorro || LINEAR || — || align=right | 2.3 km || 
|-id=697 bgcolor=#E9E9E9
| 180697 ||  || — || April 20, 2004 || Kitt Peak || Spacewatch || — || align=right | 1.1 km || 
|-id=698 bgcolor=#E9E9E9
| 180698 ||  || — || April 20, 2004 || Kitt Peak || Spacewatch || AEO || align=right | 1.5 km || 
|-id=699 bgcolor=#E9E9E9
| 180699 ||  || — || April 16, 2004 || Socorro || LINEAR || — || align=right | 3.8 km || 
|-id=700 bgcolor=#E9E9E9
| 180700 ||  || — || April 21, 2004 || Socorro || LINEAR || — || align=right | 1.9 km || 
|}

180701–180800 

|-bgcolor=#E9E9E9
| 180701 ||  || — || April 21, 2004 || Socorro || LINEAR || — || align=right | 2.4 km || 
|-id=702 bgcolor=#E9E9E9
| 180702 ||  || — || April 21, 2004 || Socorro || LINEAR || — || align=right | 2.8 km || 
|-id=703 bgcolor=#E9E9E9
| 180703 ||  || — || April 22, 2004 || Socorro || LINEAR || INO || align=right | 1.9 km || 
|-id=704 bgcolor=#E9E9E9
| 180704 ||  || — || April 22, 2004 || Siding Spring || SSS || — || align=right | 3.7 km || 
|-id=705 bgcolor=#E9E9E9
| 180705 ||  || — || April 23, 2004 || Kitt Peak || Spacewatch || — || align=right | 1.5 km || 
|-id=706 bgcolor=#E9E9E9
| 180706 ||  || — || April 23, 2004 || Catalina || CSS || MIT || align=right | 4.4 km || 
|-id=707 bgcolor=#E9E9E9
| 180707 ||  || — || April 23, 2004 || Catalina || CSS || — || align=right | 2.8 km || 
|-id=708 bgcolor=#E9E9E9
| 180708 ||  || — || April 23, 2004 || Siding Spring || SSS || — || align=right | 3.6 km || 
|-id=709 bgcolor=#E9E9E9
| 180709 ||  || — || April 26, 2004 || Kitt Peak || Spacewatch || — || align=right | 2.2 km || 
|-id=710 bgcolor=#d6d6d6
| 180710 ||  || — || April 21, 2004 || Kitt Peak || Spacewatch || — || align=right | 4.2 km || 
|-id=711 bgcolor=#d6d6d6
| 180711 ||  || — || April 21, 2004 || Kitt Peak || Spacewatch || KAR || align=right | 1.4 km || 
|-id=712 bgcolor=#E9E9E9
| 180712 ||  || — || April 21, 2004 || Kitt Peak || Spacewatch || PAD || align=right | 2.6 km || 
|-id=713 bgcolor=#d6d6d6
| 180713 ||  || — || May 10, 2004 || Catalina || CSS || TIR || align=right | 5.3 km || 
|-id=714 bgcolor=#E9E9E9
| 180714 ||  || — || May 13, 2004 || Kitt Peak || Spacewatch || — || align=right | 3.0 km || 
|-id=715 bgcolor=#E9E9E9
| 180715 ||  || — || May 13, 2004 || Anderson Mesa || LONEOS || — || align=right | 3.4 km || 
|-id=716 bgcolor=#E9E9E9
| 180716 ||  || — || May 13, 2004 || Palomar || NEAT || — || align=right | 3.7 km || 
|-id=717 bgcolor=#E9E9E9
| 180717 ||  || — || May 12, 2004 || Siding Spring || SSS || — || align=right | 2.4 km || 
|-id=718 bgcolor=#E9E9E9
| 180718 ||  || — || May 14, 2004 || Catalina || CSS || — || align=right | 2.5 km || 
|-id=719 bgcolor=#E9E9E9
| 180719 ||  || — || May 9, 2004 || Kitt Peak || Spacewatch || AGN || align=right | 1.8 km || 
|-id=720 bgcolor=#d6d6d6
| 180720 ||  || — || May 9, 2004 || Kitt Peak || Spacewatch || — || align=right | 5.0 km || 
|-id=721 bgcolor=#E9E9E9
| 180721 ||  || — || May 10, 2004 || Haleakala || NEAT || — || align=right | 2.1 km || 
|-id=722 bgcolor=#E9E9E9
| 180722 ||  || — || May 15, 2004 || Socorro || LINEAR || — || align=right | 2.1 km || 
|-id=723 bgcolor=#E9E9E9
| 180723 ||  || — || May 15, 2004 || Socorro || LINEAR || — || align=right | 4.2 km || 
|-id=724 bgcolor=#E9E9E9
| 180724 ||  || — || May 15, 2004 || Socorro || LINEAR || — || align=right | 2.4 km || 
|-id=725 bgcolor=#E9E9E9
| 180725 ||  || — || May 15, 2004 || Socorro || LINEAR || — || align=right | 3.4 km || 
|-id=726 bgcolor=#E9E9E9
| 180726 ||  || — || May 15, 2004 || Socorro || LINEAR || — || align=right | 3.1 km || 
|-id=727 bgcolor=#E9E9E9
| 180727 ||  || — || May 15, 2004 || Socorro || LINEAR || AEO || align=right | 1.7 km || 
|-id=728 bgcolor=#d6d6d6
| 180728 ||  || — || May 15, 2004 || Socorro || LINEAR || — || align=right | 4.3 km || 
|-id=729 bgcolor=#E9E9E9
| 180729 ||  || — || May 13, 2004 || Anderson Mesa || LONEOS || — || align=right | 3.7 km || 
|-id=730 bgcolor=#E9E9E9
| 180730 ||  || — || May 15, 2004 || Socorro || LINEAR || EUN || align=right | 1.6 km || 
|-id=731 bgcolor=#E9E9E9
| 180731 ||  || — || May 13, 2004 || Wrightwood || J. W. Young || HOF || align=right | 3.8 km || 
|-id=732 bgcolor=#E9E9E9
| 180732 ||  || — || May 14, 2004 || Kitt Peak || Spacewatch || — || align=right | 3.9 km || 
|-id=733 bgcolor=#d6d6d6
| 180733 ||  || — || May 15, 2004 || Needville || Needville Obs. || — || align=right | 2.3 km || 
|-id=734 bgcolor=#d6d6d6
| 180734 ||  || — || May 12, 2004 || Anderson Mesa || LONEOS || — || align=right | 5.0 km || 
|-id=735 bgcolor=#E9E9E9
| 180735 ||  || — || May 12, 2004 || Anderson Mesa || LONEOS || — || align=right | 2.1 km || 
|-id=736 bgcolor=#E9E9E9
| 180736 ||  || — || May 12, 2004 || Goodricke-Pigott || Goodricke-Pigott Obs. || — || align=right | 2.6 km || 
|-id=737 bgcolor=#E9E9E9
| 180737 ||  || — || May 10, 2004 || Kitt Peak || Spacewatch || — || align=right | 1.9 km || 
|-id=738 bgcolor=#d6d6d6
| 180738 ||  || — || May 16, 2004 || Socorro || LINEAR || — || align=right | 3.3 km || 
|-id=739 bgcolor=#E9E9E9
| 180739 Barbet ||  ||  || May 19, 2004 || Saint-Sulpice || B. Christophe || — || align=right | 3.7 km || 
|-id=740 bgcolor=#E9E9E9
| 180740 ||  || — || May 22, 2004 || Catalina || CSS || — || align=right | 2.4 km || 
|-id=741 bgcolor=#d6d6d6
| 180741 ||  || — || May 27, 2004 || Nogales || Tenagra II Obs. || — || align=right | 3.1 km || 
|-id=742 bgcolor=#E9E9E9
| 180742 ||  || — || June 6, 2004 || Catalina || CSS || — || align=right | 4.5 km || 
|-id=743 bgcolor=#E9E9E9
| 180743 ||  || — || June 11, 2004 || Palomar || NEAT || — || align=right | 2.5 km || 
|-id=744 bgcolor=#E9E9E9
| 180744 ||  || — || June 11, 2004 || Socorro || LINEAR || — || align=right | 1.9 km || 
|-id=745 bgcolor=#E9E9E9
| 180745 ||  || — || June 11, 2004 || Socorro || LINEAR || — || align=right | 2.8 km || 
|-id=746 bgcolor=#d6d6d6
| 180746 ||  || — || June 10, 2004 || Campo Imperatore || CINEOS || HYG || align=right | 2.8 km || 
|-id=747 bgcolor=#d6d6d6
| 180747 ||  || — || June 11, 2004 || Kitt Peak || Spacewatch || — || align=right | 3.7 km || 
|-id=748 bgcolor=#E9E9E9
| 180748 ||  || — || June 12, 2004 || Socorro || LINEAR || JUN || align=right | 1.6 km || 
|-id=749 bgcolor=#E9E9E9
| 180749 ||  || — || June 14, 2004 || Socorro || LINEAR || — || align=right | 5.7 km || 
|-id=750 bgcolor=#E9E9E9
| 180750 ||  || — || June 12, 2004 || Socorro || LINEAR || — || align=right | 3.0 km || 
|-id=751 bgcolor=#E9E9E9
| 180751 ||  || — || June 12, 2004 || Socorro || LINEAR || — || align=right | 2.4 km || 
|-id=752 bgcolor=#d6d6d6
| 180752 || 2004 NF || — || July 8, 2004 || Reedy Creek || J. Broughton || — || align=right | 3.2 km || 
|-id=753 bgcolor=#d6d6d6
| 180753 ||  || — || July 11, 2004 || Socorro || LINEAR || — || align=right | 3.8 km || 
|-id=754 bgcolor=#d6d6d6
| 180754 ||  || — || July 11, 2004 || Socorro || LINEAR || HYG || align=right | 3.1 km || 
|-id=755 bgcolor=#d6d6d6
| 180755 ||  || — || July 14, 2004 || Socorro || LINEAR || — || align=right | 5.1 km || 
|-id=756 bgcolor=#fefefe
| 180756 ||  || — || July 15, 2004 || Siding Spring || SSS || H || align=right | 1.0 km || 
|-id=757 bgcolor=#d6d6d6
| 180757 ||  || — || July 14, 2004 || Siding Spring || SSS || Tj (2.99) || align=right | 6.4 km || 
|-id=758 bgcolor=#E9E9E9
| 180758 ||  || — || July 16, 2004 || Socorro || LINEAR || DOR || align=right | 3.3 km || 
|-id=759 bgcolor=#d6d6d6
| 180759 ||  || — || July 18, 2004 || Socorro || LINEAR || — || align=right | 4.6 km || 
|-id=760 bgcolor=#d6d6d6
| 180760 ||  || — || July 18, 2004 || Reedy Creek || J. Broughton || JLI || align=right | 5.7 km || 
|-id=761 bgcolor=#d6d6d6
| 180761 ||  || — || July 16, 2004 || Socorro || LINEAR || — || align=right | 2.8 km || 
|-id=762 bgcolor=#d6d6d6
| 180762 ||  || — || August 7, 2004 || Palomar || NEAT || THM || align=right | 3.3 km || 
|-id=763 bgcolor=#d6d6d6
| 180763 ||  || — || August 7, 2004 || Palomar || NEAT || — || align=right | 5.5 km || 
|-id=764 bgcolor=#d6d6d6
| 180764 ||  || — || August 7, 2004 || Palomar || NEAT || ALA || align=right | 5.3 km || 
|-id=765 bgcolor=#d6d6d6
| 180765 ||  || — || August 8, 2004 || Anderson Mesa || LONEOS || HYG || align=right | 2.9 km || 
|-id=766 bgcolor=#d6d6d6
| 180766 ||  || — || August 8, 2004 || Socorro || LINEAR || — || align=right | 3.8 km || 
|-id=767 bgcolor=#d6d6d6
| 180767 ||  || — || August 8, 2004 || Campo Imperatore || CINEOS || — || align=right | 3.4 km || 
|-id=768 bgcolor=#d6d6d6
| 180768 ||  || — || August 8, 2004 || Anderson Mesa || LONEOS || — || align=right | 5.4 km || 
|-id=769 bgcolor=#d6d6d6
| 180769 ||  || — || August 9, 2004 || Socorro || LINEAR || HYG || align=right | 6.2 km || 
|-id=770 bgcolor=#d6d6d6
| 180770 ||  || — || August 10, 2004 || Socorro || LINEAR || THM || align=right | 3.0 km || 
|-id=771 bgcolor=#d6d6d6
| 180771 ||  || — || August 8, 2004 || Socorro || LINEAR || — || align=right | 6.7 km || 
|-id=772 bgcolor=#d6d6d6
| 180772 ||  || — || August 10, 2004 || Anderson Mesa || LONEOS || — || align=right | 5.6 km || 
|-id=773 bgcolor=#d6d6d6
| 180773 ||  || — || August 12, 2004 || Palomar || NEAT || LIX || align=right | 6.7 km || 
|-id=774 bgcolor=#fefefe
| 180774 ||  || — || August 17, 2004 || Socorro || LINEAR || H || align=right | 1.1 km || 
|-id=775 bgcolor=#d6d6d6
| 180775 ||  || — || August 16, 2004 || Siding Spring || SSS || — || align=right | 7.3 km || 
|-id=776 bgcolor=#d6d6d6
| 180776 ||  || — || August 21, 2004 || Siding Spring || SSS || LIX || align=right | 6.5 km || 
|-id=777 bgcolor=#d6d6d6
| 180777 ||  || — || August 27, 2004 || Anderson Mesa || LONEOS || — || align=right | 5.4 km || 
|-id=778 bgcolor=#d6d6d6
| 180778 ||  || — || September 7, 2004 || Socorro || LINEAR || — || align=right | 3.6 km || 
|-id=779 bgcolor=#d6d6d6
| 180779 ||  || — || September 7, 2004 || Socorro || LINEAR || — || align=right | 5.7 km || 
|-id=780 bgcolor=#d6d6d6
| 180780 ||  || — || September 8, 2004 || Socorro || LINEAR || — || align=right | 4.9 km || 
|-id=781 bgcolor=#d6d6d6
| 180781 ||  || — || September 8, 2004 || Socorro || LINEAR || — || align=right | 4.3 km || 
|-id=782 bgcolor=#d6d6d6
| 180782 ||  || — || September 8, 2004 || Socorro || LINEAR || THM || align=right | 3.0 km || 
|-id=783 bgcolor=#d6d6d6
| 180783 ||  || — || September 9, 2004 || Socorro || LINEAR || — || align=right | 4.2 km || 
|-id=784 bgcolor=#d6d6d6
| 180784 ||  || — || September 10, 2004 || Socorro || LINEAR || — || align=right | 5.0 km || 
|-id=785 bgcolor=#d6d6d6
| 180785 ||  || — || September 10, 2004 || Socorro || LINEAR || — || align=right | 6.2 km || 
|-id=786 bgcolor=#d6d6d6
| 180786 ||  || — || September 10, 2004 || Socorro || LINEAR || HYG || align=right | 4.4 km || 
|-id=787 bgcolor=#d6d6d6
| 180787 ||  || — || September 10, 2004 || Socorro || LINEAR || — || align=right | 5.8 km || 
|-id=788 bgcolor=#d6d6d6
| 180788 ||  || — || September 10, 2004 || Socorro || LINEAR || 7:4 || align=right | 5.4 km || 
|-id=789 bgcolor=#d6d6d6
| 180789 ||  || — || September 11, 2004 || Socorro || LINEAR || — || align=right | 7.2 km || 
|-id=790 bgcolor=#d6d6d6
| 180790 ||  || — || September 16, 2004 || Siding Spring || SSS || HYG || align=right | 4.7 km || 
|-id=791 bgcolor=#d6d6d6
| 180791 ||  || — || September 18, 2004 || Socorro || LINEAR || — || align=right | 6.4 km || 
|-id=792 bgcolor=#fefefe
| 180792 ||  || — || October 12, 2004 || Anderson Mesa || LONEOS || H || align=right | 1.1 km || 
|-id=793 bgcolor=#fefefe
| 180793 ||  || — || December 8, 2004 || Socorro || LINEAR || H || align=right | 1.7 km || 
|-id=794 bgcolor=#E9E9E9
| 180794 ||  || — || December 14, 2004 || Socorro || LINEAR || — || align=right | 1.7 km || 
|-id=795 bgcolor=#fefefe
| 180795 ||  || — || December 17, 2004 || Anderson Mesa || LONEOS || H || align=right data-sort-value="0.86" | 860 m || 
|-id=796 bgcolor=#fefefe
| 180796 ||  || — || February 14, 2005 || La Silla || A. Boattini, H. Scholl || — || align=right | 1.3 km || 
|-id=797 bgcolor=#fefefe
| 180797 ||  || — || March 1, 2005 || Kitt Peak || Spacewatch || — || align=right data-sort-value="0.82" | 820 m || 
|-id=798 bgcolor=#fefefe
| 180798 ||  || — || March 3, 2005 || Catalina || CSS || — || align=right | 1.0 km || 
|-id=799 bgcolor=#fefefe
| 180799 ||  || — || March 3, 2005 || Kitt Peak || Spacewatch || FLO || align=right data-sort-value="0.98" | 980 m || 
|-id=800 bgcolor=#fefefe
| 180800 ||  || — || March 4, 2005 || Mount Lemmon || Mount Lemmon Survey || — || align=right data-sort-value="0.99" | 990 m || 
|}

180801–180900 

|-bgcolor=#fefefe
| 180801 ||  || — || March 3, 2005 || Catalina || CSS || — || align=right data-sort-value="0.98" | 980 m || 
|-id=802 bgcolor=#fefefe
| 180802 ||  || — || March 3, 2005 || Kitt Peak || Spacewatch || — || align=right | 1.3 km || 
|-id=803 bgcolor=#fefefe
| 180803 ||  || — || March 4, 2005 || Mount Lemmon || Mount Lemmon Survey || — || align=right | 1.5 km || 
|-id=804 bgcolor=#fefefe
| 180804 ||  || — || March 4, 2005 || Mount Lemmon || Mount Lemmon Survey || — || align=right | 1.0 km || 
|-id=805 bgcolor=#fefefe
| 180805 ||  || — || March 10, 2005 || Kitt Peak || Spacewatch || — || align=right | 1.4 km || 
|-id=806 bgcolor=#fefefe
| 180806 ||  || — || March 10, 2005 || Kitt Peak || Spacewatch || FLO || align=right data-sort-value="0.71" | 710 m || 
|-id=807 bgcolor=#fefefe
| 180807 ||  || — || March 10, 2005 || Mount Lemmon || Mount Lemmon Survey || FLO || align=right data-sort-value="0.96" | 960 m || 
|-id=808 bgcolor=#fefefe
| 180808 ||  || — || March 11, 2005 || Mount Lemmon || Mount Lemmon Survey || FLO || align=right data-sort-value="0.80" | 800 m || 
|-id=809 bgcolor=#fefefe
| 180809 ||  || — || March 9, 2005 || Kitt Peak || Spacewatch || NYS || align=right data-sort-value="0.77" | 770 m || 
|-id=810 bgcolor=#fefefe
| 180810 ||  || — || March 13, 2005 || Catalina || CSS || — || align=right | 1.3 km || 
|-id=811 bgcolor=#fefefe
| 180811 ||  || — || March 13, 2005 || Kitt Peak || Spacewatch || FLO || align=right | 1.2 km || 
|-id=812 bgcolor=#fefefe
| 180812 ||  || — || March 4, 2005 || Catalina || CSS || FLO || align=right data-sort-value="0.94" | 940 m || 
|-id=813 bgcolor=#fefefe
| 180813 ||  || — || March 11, 2005 || Kitt Peak || Spacewatch || — || align=right | 2.4 km || 
|-id=814 bgcolor=#fefefe
| 180814 ||  || — || March 14, 2005 || Mount Lemmon || Mount Lemmon Survey || — || align=right | 1.0 km || 
|-id=815 bgcolor=#fefefe
| 180815 ||  || — || March 8, 2005 || Mount Lemmon || Mount Lemmon Survey || — || align=right | 1.2 km || 
|-id=816 bgcolor=#E9E9E9
| 180816 ||  || — || March 10, 2005 || Catalina || CSS || — || align=right | 4.1 km || 
|-id=817 bgcolor=#fefefe
| 180817 ||  || — || March 8, 2005 || Mount Lemmon || Mount Lemmon Survey || — || align=right data-sort-value="0.59" | 590 m || 
|-id=818 bgcolor=#fefefe
| 180818 ||  || — || March 30, 2005 || Catalina || CSS || FLO || align=right | 1.1 km || 
|-id=819 bgcolor=#fefefe
| 180819 ||  || — || March 30, 2005 || Catalina || CSS || — || align=right | 1.0 km || 
|-id=820 bgcolor=#fefefe
| 180820 ||  || — || March 17, 2005 || Kitt Peak || Spacewatch || FLO || align=right data-sort-value="0.90" | 900 m || 
|-id=821 bgcolor=#fefefe
| 180821 ||  || — || April 1, 2005 || Kitt Peak || Spacewatch || V || align=right | 1.0 km || 
|-id=822 bgcolor=#fefefe
| 180822 ||  || — || April 1, 2005 || Kitt Peak || Spacewatch || — || align=right | 1.4 km || 
|-id=823 bgcolor=#fefefe
| 180823 ||  || — || April 1, 2005 || Kitt Peak || Spacewatch || FLO || align=right data-sort-value="0.77" | 770 m || 
|-id=824 bgcolor=#fefefe
| 180824 Kabos ||  ||  || April 2, 2005 || Piszkéstető || K. Sárneczky || — || align=right data-sort-value="0.98" | 980 m || 
|-id=825 bgcolor=#fefefe
| 180825 ||  || — || April 2, 2005 || Siding Spring || R. H. McNaught || PHO || align=right | 1.6 km || 
|-id=826 bgcolor=#fefefe
| 180826 ||  || — || April 2, 2005 || Mount Lemmon || Mount Lemmon Survey || — || align=right data-sort-value="0.86" | 860 m || 
|-id=827 bgcolor=#fefefe
| 180827 ||  || — || April 2, 2005 || Anderson Mesa || LONEOS || FLO || align=right data-sort-value="0.97" | 970 m || 
|-id=828 bgcolor=#fefefe
| 180828 ||  || — || April 3, 2005 || Palomar || NEAT || — || align=right | 1.0 km || 
|-id=829 bgcolor=#fefefe
| 180829 ||  || — || April 5, 2005 || Palomar || NEAT || — || align=right | 1.4 km || 
|-id=830 bgcolor=#fefefe
| 180830 ||  || — || April 5, 2005 || Anderson Mesa || LONEOS || — || align=right data-sort-value="0.98" | 980 m || 
|-id=831 bgcolor=#fefefe
| 180831 ||  || — || April 5, 2005 || Mount Lemmon || Mount Lemmon Survey || V || align=right data-sort-value="0.73" | 730 m || 
|-id=832 bgcolor=#fefefe
| 180832 ||  || — || April 5, 2005 || Mount Lemmon || Mount Lemmon Survey || MAS || align=right | 1.2 km || 
|-id=833 bgcolor=#fefefe
| 180833 ||  || — || April 2, 2005 || Mount Lemmon || Mount Lemmon Survey || V || align=right | 1.1 km || 
|-id=834 bgcolor=#fefefe
| 180834 ||  || — || April 6, 2005 || Mount Lemmon || Mount Lemmon Survey || — || align=right data-sort-value="0.95" | 950 m || 
|-id=835 bgcolor=#E9E9E9
| 180835 ||  || — || April 9, 2005 || RAS || A. Lowe || — || align=right | 1.6 km || 
|-id=836 bgcolor=#fefefe
| 180836 ||  || — || April 2, 2005 || Mount Lemmon || Mount Lemmon Survey || — || align=right | 1.3 km || 
|-id=837 bgcolor=#fefefe
| 180837 ||  || — || April 4, 2005 || Catalina || CSS || — || align=right | 1.2 km || 
|-id=838 bgcolor=#fefefe
| 180838 ||  || — || April 5, 2005 || Catalina || CSS || FLO || align=right | 1.0 km || 
|-id=839 bgcolor=#fefefe
| 180839 ||  || — || April 7, 2005 || Kitt Peak || Spacewatch || FLO || align=right | 1.1 km || 
|-id=840 bgcolor=#fefefe
| 180840 ||  || — || April 4, 2005 || Socorro || LINEAR || — || align=right | 1.2 km || 
|-id=841 bgcolor=#fefefe
| 180841 ||  || — || April 5, 2005 || Catalina || CSS || V || align=right | 1.1 km || 
|-id=842 bgcolor=#fefefe
| 180842 ||  || — || April 6, 2005 || Kitt Peak || Spacewatch || — || align=right data-sort-value="0.98" | 980 m || 
|-id=843 bgcolor=#fefefe
| 180843 ||  || — || April 10, 2005 || Mount Lemmon || Mount Lemmon Survey || — || align=right data-sort-value="0.56" | 560 m || 
|-id=844 bgcolor=#fefefe
| 180844 ||  || — || April 9, 2005 || Socorro || LINEAR || — || align=right | 1.6 km || 
|-id=845 bgcolor=#fefefe
| 180845 ||  || — || April 10, 2005 || Mount Lemmon || Mount Lemmon Survey || — || align=right | 1.0 km || 
|-id=846 bgcolor=#fefefe
| 180846 ||  || — || April 10, 2005 || Kitt Peak || Spacewatch || — || align=right | 1.2 km || 
|-id=847 bgcolor=#fefefe
| 180847 ||  || — || April 10, 2005 || Kitt Peak || Spacewatch || FLO || align=right data-sort-value="0.98" | 980 m || 
|-id=848 bgcolor=#fefefe
| 180848 ||  || — || April 13, 2005 || Anderson Mesa || LONEOS || — || align=right data-sort-value="0.94" | 940 m || 
|-id=849 bgcolor=#fefefe
| 180849 ||  || — || April 13, 2005 || Anderson Mesa || LONEOS || V || align=right data-sort-value="0.82" | 820 m || 
|-id=850 bgcolor=#fefefe
| 180850 ||  || — || April 13, 2005 || Anderson Mesa || LONEOS || — || align=right | 1.1 km || 
|-id=851 bgcolor=#fefefe
| 180851 ||  || — || April 14, 2005 || Catalina || CSS || — || align=right | 1.0 km || 
|-id=852 bgcolor=#fefefe
| 180852 ||  || — || April 11, 2005 || Mount Lemmon || Mount Lemmon Survey || — || align=right | 1.3 km || 
|-id=853 bgcolor=#fefefe
| 180853 ||  || — || April 11, 2005 || Mount Lemmon || Mount Lemmon Survey || — || align=right data-sort-value="0.74" | 740 m || 
|-id=854 bgcolor=#fefefe
| 180854 ||  || — || April 12, 2005 || Kitt Peak || Spacewatch || — || align=right | 1.0 km || 
|-id=855 bgcolor=#fefefe
| 180855 Debrarose ||  ||  || April 11, 2005 || Kitt Peak || M. W. Buie || FLO || align=right data-sort-value="0.95" | 950 m || 
|-id=856 bgcolor=#E9E9E9
| 180856 ||  || — || April 30, 2005 || Kitt Peak || Spacewatch || — || align=right | 1.4 km || 
|-id=857 bgcolor=#fefefe
| 180857 Hofigéza ||  ||  || April 28, 2005 || Piszkéstető || K. Sárneczky || FLO || align=right data-sort-value="0.95" | 950 m || 
|-id=858 bgcolor=#fefefe
| 180858 ||  || — || April 30, 2005 || Palomar || NEAT || — || align=right | 1.3 km || 
|-id=859 bgcolor=#fefefe
| 180859 ||  || — || May 4, 2005 || Palomar || NEAT || FLO || align=right | 1.0 km || 
|-id=860 bgcolor=#fefefe
| 180860 ||  || — || May 4, 2005 || Socorro || LINEAR || — || align=right | 1.2 km || 
|-id=861 bgcolor=#fefefe
| 180861 ||  || — || May 1, 2005 || Palomar || NEAT || FLO || align=right | 1.0 km || 
|-id=862 bgcolor=#fefefe
| 180862 ||  || — || May 3, 2005 || Kitt Peak || Spacewatch || V || align=right | 1.1 km || 
|-id=863 bgcolor=#fefefe
| 180863 ||  || — || May 3, 2005 || Kitt Peak || Spacewatch || — || align=right | 1.2 km || 
|-id=864 bgcolor=#fefefe
| 180864 ||  || — || May 3, 2005 || Socorro || LINEAR || V || align=right | 1.0 km || 
|-id=865 bgcolor=#fefefe
| 180865 ||  || — || May 3, 2005 || Kitt Peak || Spacewatch || — || align=right data-sort-value="0.94" | 940 m || 
|-id=866 bgcolor=#fefefe
| 180866 ||  || — || May 4, 2005 || Kitt Peak || Spacewatch || FLO || align=right data-sort-value="0.93" | 930 m || 
|-id=867 bgcolor=#E9E9E9
| 180867 ||  || — || May 7, 2005 || Mount Lemmon || Mount Lemmon Survey || — || align=right | 1.5 km || 
|-id=868 bgcolor=#fefefe
| 180868 ||  || — || May 8, 2005 || Anderson Mesa || LONEOS || — || align=right | 1.1 km || 
|-id=869 bgcolor=#fefefe
| 180869 ||  || — || May 8, 2005 || Socorro || LINEAR || — || align=right data-sort-value="0.99" | 990 m || 
|-id=870 bgcolor=#fefefe
| 180870 ||  || — || May 8, 2005 || Mount Lemmon || Mount Lemmon Survey || MAS || align=right | 1.0 km || 
|-id=871 bgcolor=#fefefe
| 180871 ||  || — || May 4, 2005 || Mount Lemmon || Mount Lemmon Survey || MAS || align=right data-sort-value="0.89" | 890 m || 
|-id=872 bgcolor=#fefefe
| 180872 ||  || — || May 8, 2005 || Mount Lemmon || Mount Lemmon Survey || NYS || align=right data-sort-value="0.79" | 790 m || 
|-id=873 bgcolor=#E9E9E9
| 180873 ||  || — || May 8, 2005 || Siding Spring || SSS || — || align=right | 1.6 km || 
|-id=874 bgcolor=#fefefe
| 180874 ||  || — || May 3, 2005 || Kitt Peak || Spacewatch || V || align=right data-sort-value="0.87" | 870 m || 
|-id=875 bgcolor=#fefefe
| 180875 ||  || — || May 8, 2005 || Catalina || CSS || FLO || align=right | 1.0 km || 
|-id=876 bgcolor=#E9E9E9
| 180876 ||  || — || May 10, 2005 || Kitt Peak || Spacewatch || — || align=right | 1.7 km || 
|-id=877 bgcolor=#E9E9E9
| 180877 ||  || — || May 11, 2005 || Mount Lemmon || Mount Lemmon Survey || — || align=right | 2.5 km || 
|-id=878 bgcolor=#fefefe
| 180878 ||  || — || May 10, 2005 || Mount Lemmon || Mount Lemmon Survey || — || align=right | 1.1 km || 
|-id=879 bgcolor=#fefefe
| 180879 ||  || — || May 11, 2005 || Palomar || NEAT || NYS || align=right data-sort-value="0.99" | 990 m || 
|-id=880 bgcolor=#fefefe
| 180880 ||  || — || May 9, 2005 || Mount Lemmon || Mount Lemmon Survey || — || align=right data-sort-value="0.95" | 950 m || 
|-id=881 bgcolor=#fefefe
| 180881 ||  || — || May 10, 2005 || Mount Lemmon || Mount Lemmon Survey || — || align=right data-sort-value="0.98" | 980 m || 
|-id=882 bgcolor=#fefefe
| 180882 ||  || — || May 9, 2005 || Anderson Mesa || LONEOS || FLO || align=right data-sort-value="0.87" | 870 m || 
|-id=883 bgcolor=#E9E9E9
| 180883 ||  || — || May 9, 2005 || Catalina || CSS || — || align=right | 1.9 km || 
|-id=884 bgcolor=#fefefe
| 180884 ||  || — || May 10, 2005 || Kitt Peak || Spacewatch || — || align=right | 1.2 km || 
|-id=885 bgcolor=#fefefe
| 180885 ||  || — || May 11, 2005 || Kitt Peak || Spacewatch || — || align=right | 1.1 km || 
|-id=886 bgcolor=#E9E9E9
| 180886 ||  || — || May 11, 2005 || Kitt Peak || Spacewatch || — || align=right | 1.6 km || 
|-id=887 bgcolor=#E9E9E9
| 180887 ||  || — || May 11, 2005 || Kitt Peak || Spacewatch || — || align=right | 3.6 km || 
|-id=888 bgcolor=#fefefe
| 180888 ||  || — || May 11, 2005 || Palomar || NEAT || NYS || align=right data-sort-value="0.91" | 910 m || 
|-id=889 bgcolor=#fefefe
| 180889 ||  || — || May 14, 2005 || Kitt Peak || Spacewatch || — || align=right | 1.2 km || 
|-id=890 bgcolor=#fefefe
| 180890 ||  || — || May 15, 2005 || Mount Lemmon || Mount Lemmon Survey || — || align=right | 1.4 km || 
|-id=891 bgcolor=#fefefe
| 180891 ||  || — || May 13, 2005 || Kitt Peak || Spacewatch || NYS || align=right data-sort-value="0.82" | 820 m || 
|-id=892 bgcolor=#E9E9E9
| 180892 ||  || — || May 15, 2005 || Mount Lemmon || Mount Lemmon Survey || — || align=right | 1.8 km || 
|-id=893 bgcolor=#E9E9E9
| 180893 ||  || — || May 14, 2005 || Kitt Peak || Spacewatch || — || align=right | 1.9 km || 
|-id=894 bgcolor=#fefefe
| 180894 ||  || — || May 3, 2005 || Kitt Peak || Spacewatch || V || align=right data-sort-value="0.76" | 760 m || 
|-id=895 bgcolor=#fefefe
| 180895 ||  || — || May 4, 2005 || Palomar || NEAT || — || align=right | 1.2 km || 
|-id=896 bgcolor=#fefefe
| 180896 ||  || — || May 8, 2005 || Anderson Mesa || LONEOS || — || align=right | 1.3 km || 
|-id=897 bgcolor=#E9E9E9
| 180897 ||  || — || May 8, 2005 || Kitt Peak || Spacewatch || — || align=right | 1.3 km || 
|-id=898 bgcolor=#fefefe
| 180898 ||  || — || May 8, 2005 || Kitt Peak || Spacewatch || — || align=right | 1.0 km || 
|-id=899 bgcolor=#fefefe
| 180899 ||  || — || May 8, 2005 || Mount Lemmon || Mount Lemmon Survey || — || align=right | 1.2 km || 
|-id=900 bgcolor=#fefefe
| 180900 ||  || — || May 10, 2005 || Mount Lemmon || Mount Lemmon Survey || MAS || align=right data-sort-value="0.95" | 950 m || 
|}

180901–181000 

|-bgcolor=#fefefe
| 180901 ||  || — || May 12, 2005 || Socorro || LINEAR || — || align=right | 1.3 km || 
|-id=902 bgcolor=#E9E9E9
| 180902 ||  || — || May 13, 2005 || Mount Lemmon || Mount Lemmon Survey || — || align=right | 1.3 km || 
|-id=903 bgcolor=#d6d6d6
| 180903 ||  || — || May 13, 2005 || Kitt Peak || Spacewatch || — || align=right | 5.2 km || 
|-id=904 bgcolor=#fefefe
| 180904 ||  || — || May 14, 2005 || Palomar || NEAT || FLO || align=right data-sort-value="0.81" | 810 m || 
|-id=905 bgcolor=#fefefe
| 180905 ||  || — || May 1, 2005 || Palomar || NEAT || — || align=right | 1.1 km || 
|-id=906 bgcolor=#fefefe
| 180906 ||  || — || May 18, 2005 || Palomar || NEAT || — || align=right data-sort-value="0.92" | 920 m || 
|-id=907 bgcolor=#fefefe
| 180907 ||  || — || May 20, 2005 || Mount Lemmon || Mount Lemmon Survey || FLO || align=right data-sort-value="0.77" | 770 m || 
|-id=908 bgcolor=#fefefe
| 180908 ||  || — || May 16, 2005 || Mount Lemmon || Mount Lemmon Survey || — || align=right | 1.0 km || 
|-id=909 bgcolor=#fefefe
| 180909 ||  || — || May 30, 2005 || Reedy Creek || J. Broughton || FLO || align=right data-sort-value="0.85" | 850 m || 
|-id=910 bgcolor=#E9E9E9
| 180910 ||  || — || May 31, 2005 || Reedy Creek || J. Broughton || — || align=right | 1.3 km || 
|-id=911 bgcolor=#fefefe
| 180911 ||  || — || May 30, 2005 || Siding Spring || SSS || — || align=right | 1.6 km || 
|-id=912 bgcolor=#fefefe
| 180912 ||  || — || June 2, 2005 || Catalina || CSS || — || align=right | 1.2 km || 
|-id=913 bgcolor=#fefefe
| 180913 ||  || — || June 1, 2005 || Kitt Peak || Spacewatch || V || align=right data-sort-value="0.92" | 920 m || 
|-id=914 bgcolor=#fefefe
| 180914 ||  || — || June 2, 2005 || Siding Spring || SSS || ERI || align=right | 2.2 km || 
|-id=915 bgcolor=#fefefe
| 180915 ||  || — || June 2, 2005 || Siding Spring || SSS || — || align=right | 1.2 km || 
|-id=916 bgcolor=#fefefe
| 180916 ||  || — || June 1, 2005 || Kitt Peak || Spacewatch || V || align=right data-sort-value="0.90" | 900 m || 
|-id=917 bgcolor=#E9E9E9
| 180917 ||  || — || June 2, 2005 || Siding Spring || SSS || — || align=right | 2.7 km || 
|-id=918 bgcolor=#fefefe
| 180918 ||  || — || June 3, 2005 || Kitt Peak || Spacewatch || V || align=right | 1.1 km || 
|-id=919 bgcolor=#E9E9E9
| 180919 ||  || — || June 5, 2005 || Kitt Peak || Spacewatch || RAF || align=right | 1.9 km || 
|-id=920 bgcolor=#E9E9E9
| 180920 ||  || — || June 5, 2005 || Kitt Peak || Spacewatch || — || align=right | 1.9 km || 
|-id=921 bgcolor=#fefefe
| 180921 ||  || — || June 6, 2005 || Kitt Peak || Spacewatch || V || align=right data-sort-value="0.89" | 890 m || 
|-id=922 bgcolor=#E9E9E9
| 180922 ||  || — || June 6, 2005 || Kitt Peak || Spacewatch || — || align=right | 2.7 km || 
|-id=923 bgcolor=#fefefe
| 180923 ||  || — || June 6, 2005 || Kitt Peak || Spacewatch || NYS || align=right data-sort-value="0.81" | 810 m || 
|-id=924 bgcolor=#fefefe
| 180924 ||  || — || June 6, 2005 || Kitt Peak || Spacewatch || — || align=right | 1.2 km || 
|-id=925 bgcolor=#fefefe
| 180925 ||  || — || June 3, 2005 || Siding Spring || SSS || PHO || align=right | 1.5 km || 
|-id=926 bgcolor=#fefefe
| 180926 ||  || — || June 11, 2005 || Junk Bond || Junk Bond Obs. || — || align=right | 1.7 km || 
|-id=927 bgcolor=#fefefe
| 180927 ||  || — || June 7, 2005 || Catalina || CSS || — || align=right | 1.6 km || 
|-id=928 bgcolor=#E9E9E9
| 180928 ||  || — || June 8, 2005 || Kitt Peak || Spacewatch || — || align=right | 1.6 km || 
|-id=929 bgcolor=#fefefe
| 180929 ||  || — || June 9, 2005 || Kitt Peak || Spacewatch || — || align=right | 1.0 km || 
|-id=930 bgcolor=#d6d6d6
| 180930 ||  || — || June 12, 2005 || Kitt Peak || Spacewatch || — || align=right | 5.1 km || 
|-id=931 bgcolor=#E9E9E9
| 180931 ||  || — || June 12, 2005 || 7300 Observatory || 7300 Obs. || — || align=right | 1.7 km || 
|-id=932 bgcolor=#E9E9E9
| 180932 ||  || — || June 13, 2005 || Mount Lemmon || Mount Lemmon Survey || — || align=right | 1.8 km || 
|-id=933 bgcolor=#fefefe
| 180933 ||  || — || June 9, 2005 || Kitt Peak || Spacewatch || FLO || align=right data-sort-value="0.87" | 870 m || 
|-id=934 bgcolor=#fefefe
| 180934 ||  || — || June 10, 2005 || Kitt Peak || Spacewatch || FLO || align=right data-sort-value="0.81" | 810 m || 
|-id=935 bgcolor=#fefefe
| 180935 ||  || — || June 11, 2005 || Kitt Peak || Spacewatch || FLO || align=right data-sort-value="0.87" | 870 m || 
|-id=936 bgcolor=#fefefe
| 180936 ||  || — || June 14, 2005 || Kitt Peak || Spacewatch || NYS || align=right data-sort-value="0.91" | 910 m || 
|-id=937 bgcolor=#E9E9E9
| 180937 ||  || — || June 12, 2005 || Kitt Peak || Spacewatch || — || align=right | 1.4 km || 
|-id=938 bgcolor=#fefefe
| 180938 ||  || — || June 13, 2005 || Kitt Peak || Spacewatch || — || align=right data-sort-value="0.73" | 730 m || 
|-id=939 bgcolor=#E9E9E9
| 180939 ||  || — || June 13, 2005 || Mount Lemmon || Mount Lemmon Survey || — || align=right | 2.0 km || 
|-id=940 bgcolor=#fefefe
| 180940 Bighornfire ||  ||  || June 17, 2005 || Mount Lemmon || Mount Lemmon Survey || NYS || align=right data-sort-value="0.98" | 980 m || 
|-id=941 bgcolor=#fefefe
| 180941 ||  || — || June 18, 2005 || Mount Lemmon || Mount Lemmon Survey || — || align=right | 1.7 km || 
|-id=942 bgcolor=#fefefe
| 180942 ||  || — || June 20, 2005 || Palomar || NEAT || NYS || align=right | 1.3 km || 
|-id=943 bgcolor=#E9E9E9
| 180943 ||  || — || June 17, 2005 || Mount Lemmon || Mount Lemmon Survey || — || align=right | 1.2 km || 
|-id=944 bgcolor=#fefefe
| 180944 ||  || — || June 27, 2005 || Kitt Peak || Spacewatch || FLO || align=right data-sort-value="0.94" | 940 m || 
|-id=945 bgcolor=#fefefe
| 180945 ||  || — || June 27, 2005 || Kitt Peak || Spacewatch || FLO || align=right data-sort-value="0.94" | 940 m || 
|-id=946 bgcolor=#fefefe
| 180946 ||  || — || June 28, 2005 || Palomar || NEAT || — || align=right | 1.6 km || 
|-id=947 bgcolor=#fefefe
| 180947 ||  || — || June 27, 2005 || Junk Bond || D. Healy || NYS || align=right data-sort-value="0.96" | 960 m || 
|-id=948 bgcolor=#E9E9E9
| 180948 ||  || — || June 28, 2005 || Mount Lemmon || Mount Lemmon Survey || — || align=right | 2.0 km || 
|-id=949 bgcolor=#E9E9E9
| 180949 ||  || — || June 27, 2005 || Kitt Peak || Spacewatch || — || align=right | 2.4 km || 
|-id=950 bgcolor=#E9E9E9
| 180950 ||  || — || June 27, 2005 || Kitt Peak || Spacewatch || — || align=right | 2.8 km || 
|-id=951 bgcolor=#fefefe
| 180951 ||  || — || June 30, 2005 || Kitt Peak || Spacewatch || NYS || align=right data-sort-value="0.94" | 940 m || 
|-id=952 bgcolor=#fefefe
| 180952 ||  || — || June 30, 2005 || Kitt Peak || Spacewatch || — || align=right | 1.1 km || 
|-id=953 bgcolor=#E9E9E9
| 180953 ||  || — || June 30, 2005 || Kitt Peak || Spacewatch || — || align=right | 3.5 km || 
|-id=954 bgcolor=#E9E9E9
| 180954 ||  || — || June 30, 2005 || Kitt Peak || Spacewatch || — || align=right | 1.2 km || 
|-id=955 bgcolor=#E9E9E9
| 180955 ||  || — || June 29, 2005 || Kitt Peak || Spacewatch || — || align=right | 3.2 km || 
|-id=956 bgcolor=#fefefe
| 180956 ||  || — || June 28, 2005 || Palomar || NEAT || MAS || align=right | 1.1 km || 
|-id=957 bgcolor=#fefefe
| 180957 ||  || — || June 28, 2005 || Palomar || NEAT || NYS || align=right | 1.5 km || 
|-id=958 bgcolor=#fefefe
| 180958 ||  || — || June 29, 2005 || Kitt Peak || Spacewatch || NYS || align=right data-sort-value="0.98" | 980 m || 
|-id=959 bgcolor=#d6d6d6
| 180959 ||  || — || June 29, 2005 || Palomar || NEAT || MEL || align=right | 5.4 km || 
|-id=960 bgcolor=#d6d6d6
| 180960 ||  || — || June 29, 2005 || Palomar || NEAT || SAN || align=right | 2.0 km || 
|-id=961 bgcolor=#fefefe
| 180961 ||  || — || June 30, 2005 || Kitt Peak || Spacewatch || EUT || align=right data-sort-value="0.90" | 900 m || 
|-id=962 bgcolor=#fefefe
| 180962 ||  || — || June 30, 2005 || Kitt Peak || Spacewatch || MASslow || align=right | 1.5 km || 
|-id=963 bgcolor=#E9E9E9
| 180963 ||  || — || June 30, 2005 || Kitt Peak || Spacewatch || — || align=right | 1.9 km || 
|-id=964 bgcolor=#E9E9E9
| 180964 ||  || — || June 30, 2005 || Kitt Peak || Spacewatch || — || align=right | 3.6 km || 
|-id=965 bgcolor=#d6d6d6
| 180965 ||  || — || June 30, 2005 || Kitt Peak || Spacewatch || K-2 || align=right | 1.7 km || 
|-id=966 bgcolor=#E9E9E9
| 180966 ||  || — || June 30, 2005 || Kitt Peak || Spacewatch || — || align=right | 2.9 km || 
|-id=967 bgcolor=#d6d6d6
| 180967 ||  || — || June 30, 2005 || Kitt Peak || Spacewatch || KOR || align=right | 1.6 km || 
|-id=968 bgcolor=#E9E9E9
| 180968 ||  || — || June 30, 2005 || Palomar || NEAT || WIT || align=right | 1.4 km || 
|-id=969 bgcolor=#E9E9E9
| 180969 ||  || — || June 29, 2005 || Kitt Peak || Spacewatch || — || align=right | 2.9 km || 
|-id=970 bgcolor=#E9E9E9
| 180970 ||  || — || June 29, 2005 || Palomar || NEAT || — || align=right | 3.4 km || 
|-id=971 bgcolor=#E9E9E9
| 180971 ||  || — || June 29, 2005 || Palomar || NEAT || — || align=right | 1.3 km || 
|-id=972 bgcolor=#fefefe
| 180972 ||  || — || June 28, 2005 || Palomar || NEAT || — || align=right | 1.2 km || 
|-id=973 bgcolor=#E9E9E9
| 180973 ||  || — || June 28, 2005 || Palomar || NEAT || — || align=right | 1.3 km || 
|-id=974 bgcolor=#d6d6d6
| 180974 ||  || — || June 28, 2005 || Palomar || NEAT || — || align=right | 4.2 km || 
|-id=975 bgcolor=#d6d6d6
| 180975 ||  || — || June 29, 2005 || Kitt Peak || Spacewatch || — || align=right | 4.1 km || 
|-id=976 bgcolor=#E9E9E9
| 180976 ||  || — || June 30, 2005 || Kitt Peak || Spacewatch || — || align=right | 1.8 km || 
|-id=977 bgcolor=#E9E9E9
| 180977 ||  || — || July 4, 2005 || RAS || A. Lowe || DOR || align=right | 3.6 km || 
|-id=978 bgcolor=#E9E9E9
| 180978 ||  || — || July 4, 2005 || Kitt Peak || Spacewatch || — || align=right | 3.9 km || 
|-id=979 bgcolor=#d6d6d6
| 180979 ||  || — || July 1, 2005 || Kitt Peak || Spacewatch || — || align=right | 3.1 km || 
|-id=980 bgcolor=#d6d6d6
| 180980 ||  || — || July 1, 2005 || Kitt Peak || Spacewatch || VER || align=right | 3.3 km || 
|-id=981 bgcolor=#E9E9E9
| 180981 ||  || — || July 1, 2005 || Kitt Peak || Spacewatch || — || align=right | 1.9 km || 
|-id=982 bgcolor=#E9E9E9
| 180982 ||  || — || July 4, 2005 || Kitt Peak || Spacewatch || HEN || align=right | 1.4 km || 
|-id=983 bgcolor=#E9E9E9
| 180983 ||  || — || July 4, 2005 || Mount Lemmon || Mount Lemmon Survey || — || align=right | 2.3 km || 
|-id=984 bgcolor=#E9E9E9
| 180984 ||  || — || July 4, 2005 || Palomar || NEAT || — || align=right | 4.1 km || 
|-id=985 bgcolor=#fefefe
| 180985 ||  || — || July 4, 2005 || Mount Lemmon || Mount Lemmon Survey || NYS || align=right | 1.2 km || 
|-id=986 bgcolor=#E9E9E9
| 180986 ||  || — || July 5, 2005 || Kitt Peak || Spacewatch || — || align=right | 3.4 km || 
|-id=987 bgcolor=#E9E9E9
| 180987 ||  || — || July 2, 2005 || Kitt Peak || Spacewatch || WIT || align=right | 1.6 km || 
|-id=988 bgcolor=#E9E9E9
| 180988 ||  || — || July 2, 2005 || Kitt Peak || Spacewatch || NEM || align=right | 3.0 km || 
|-id=989 bgcolor=#fefefe
| 180989 ||  || — || July 2, 2005 || Kitt Peak || Spacewatch || — || align=right | 1.0 km || 
|-id=990 bgcolor=#E9E9E9
| 180990 ||  || — || July 3, 2005 || Mount Lemmon || Mount Lemmon Survey || HEN || align=right | 1.4 km || 
|-id=991 bgcolor=#d6d6d6
| 180991 ||  || — || July 5, 2005 || Mount Lemmon || Mount Lemmon Survey || KAR || align=right | 1.4 km || 
|-id=992 bgcolor=#fefefe
| 180992 ||  || — || July 4, 2005 || Socorro || LINEAR || — || align=right | 2.0 km || 
|-id=993 bgcolor=#fefefe
| 180993 ||  || — || July 2, 2005 || Reedy Creek || J. Broughton || — || align=right | 1.6 km || 
|-id=994 bgcolor=#E9E9E9
| 180994 ||  || — || July 1, 2005 || Kitt Peak || Spacewatch || HOF || align=right | 3.2 km || 
|-id=995 bgcolor=#E9E9E9
| 180995 ||  || — || July 1, 2005 || Kitt Peak || Spacewatch || MRX || align=right | 1.1 km || 
|-id=996 bgcolor=#d6d6d6
| 180996 ||  || — || July 4, 2005 || Kitt Peak || Spacewatch || CHA || align=right | 2.9 km || 
|-id=997 bgcolor=#E9E9E9
| 180997 ||  || — || July 3, 2005 || Mount Lemmon || Mount Lemmon Survey || — || align=right | 2.5 km || 
|-id=998 bgcolor=#d6d6d6
| 180998 ||  || — || July 5, 2005 || Palomar || NEAT || — || align=right | 4.1 km || 
|-id=999 bgcolor=#E9E9E9
| 180999 ||  || — || July 6, 2005 || Reedy Creek || J. Broughton || — || align=right | 1.4 km || 
|-id=000 bgcolor=#fefefe
| 181000 ||  || — || July 6, 2005 || Reedy Creek || J. Broughton || — || align=right | 1.3 km || 
|}

References

External links 
 Discovery Circumstances: Numbered Minor Planets (180001)–(185000) (IAU Minor Planet Center)

0180